= Pampaluctor =

Pampaluctor Temporal range: Late Pliocene–Early Pleistocene (middle Marplatan [SALMA])
- Diagram showing known remains compared to a human

Scientific classification
- Kingdom: Animalia
- Phylum: Chordata
- Class: Mammalia
- Order: †Sparassodonta
- Family: †Thylacosmilidae
- Genus: †Pampaluctor del Campo et al., 2026
- Species: †P. calibar

Binomial name
- †Pampaluctor calibar del Campo et al., 2026

Extinct mammal genus

Pampaluctor is an extinct genus of metatherian mammal in the Thylacosmilidae, a family of carnivorous, saber-toothed sparassodonts. The genus contains a single species, Pampaluctor calibar, known from a partial skeleton. It is known from the Vorohué Formation of Argentina, which is assigned to the Vorohuean subage of the Marplatan South American land mammal age (SALMA), which is correlated to the late Pliocene to early Pleistocene epochs. With an estimated body mass of around 100 kilograms (220 lb), Pampaluctor is among the largest known mammalian predators from South America. It is also the geologically youngest thylacosmilid (and sparassodont), as other members of this clade did not cross the Plio-Pleistocene boundary.

== Discovery and naming ==
P. calibar type locality in Buenos Aires Province, Argentina

The Pampaluctor fossil material was discovered in outcrops of the Vorohué Formation on a coastal cliff north of Miramar in Buenos Aires Province, Argentina. The specimen is housed in the paleontology collections of the Punta Hermengo Municipal Museum in Miramar, where it is permanently accessioned as specimen MPH P0730. It consists of a partial postcranial skeleton, comprising the first six cervical (neck) vertebrae, a partial right scapula, the distal end of the right humerus, the shaft of the right radius, most of the left femur, the shaft of the left tibia, two caudal (tail) vertebrae, and a small unidentified distal limb bone fragment.

In 2026, Eric N. del Campo and colleagues described Pampaluctor calibar as a new genus and species of thylacosmilid mammal based on these fossil remains, designating MPH P0730 as the holotype specimen. The generic name, Pampaluctor, combines a reference to the Argentina Pampas region in which the holotype was found, with the Latin word luctor, meaning 'to wrestle'. The specific name, calibar, references Calibar, the 19th century thief-tracking gaucho of Central Argentina.

A single humerus and two associated molars (specimen CCA-196) were found in the Argentine El Polvorín Formation, which has been paleomagnetically dated to ~3.55 to 2.59 million years ago. Given their comparable age, as well as the anatomical similarities of this humerus to that of the P. calibar holotype, it is possible that CCA-196 represents another specimen of this taxon. Notably, these specimens occur comparatively recently in the fossil record (crossing the Pliocene–Pleistocene boundary), making them the youngest known sparassodonts. As such, they may have coexisted with placental carnivores that began entering South America near this time.

== Description and paleobiology ==
Though many of the skeletal elements of the only definitive Pampaluctor specimen are incomplete, the atlas (first cervical vertebra) and humerus are notably more robust than the closely related Thylacosmilus. These combined features suggest powerful neck muscles and strong forelimbs. In Pampaluctor, the tibia was likely shorter than the femur, which, combined with the robust neck and arms, is suggestive of an ambush predator ecology capable of grasping and immobilizing prey. The preserved caudal vertebrae are proportionally short compared to other sparassodonts, instead being comparable to the extinct thylacine, a marsupial.

Based on the measurements of the femur, del Campo et al. (2026) estimated the body mass of Pampaluctor at 96–100 kg (212–220 lb), comparable to or larger than the holotype of Thylacosmilus atrox, which has an estimated body mass ranging from 55.9–107.9 kg (123–238 lb). The only sparassodonts with an estimated larger size are some proborhyaenids, at up to 200 kg (440 lb). For comparison, male pumas and jaguars—two extant felids—have body masses of 60 kg (130 lb) and 85 kg (187 lb), respectively. As such, Pampaluctor is not only among the largest sparassodonts known, but also one of the largest mammalian predators known from South America.

== Classification ==
To test the affinities and relationships of Pampaluctor, del Campo et al. (2026) included it in an updated version of the phylogenetic matrix of Suarez et al. (2025), a publication that had described the more basal thylacosmiliform Dimartinia. Pampaluctor was recovered as the sister taxon to Thylacosmilus, with the other two named thylacosmilids, Anachlysictis and Patagosmilus, forming their own clade. The result of their analysis using implied weighting (k = 3) are displayed in the cladogram below:

- †Borhyaenoidea
  - †Lycopsis spp.
  - - †Thylacosmiliformes
      - †Dimartinia pristina
      - - IGM 251108
          (unnamed La Venta taxon)
        - †Thylacosmilidae
          - - †Pampaluctor calibar
            - †Thylacosmilus atrox
          - - †Anachlysictis gracilis
            - †Patagosmilus goini
    - - UF 27881
        (unnamed Honda Group taxon)
      - - †Prothylacynus patagonicus
        - - †Pharsophorus lacerans
          - - †Eomakhaira molossus
            - - †Proborhyaenidae
              - †Borhyaenidae
