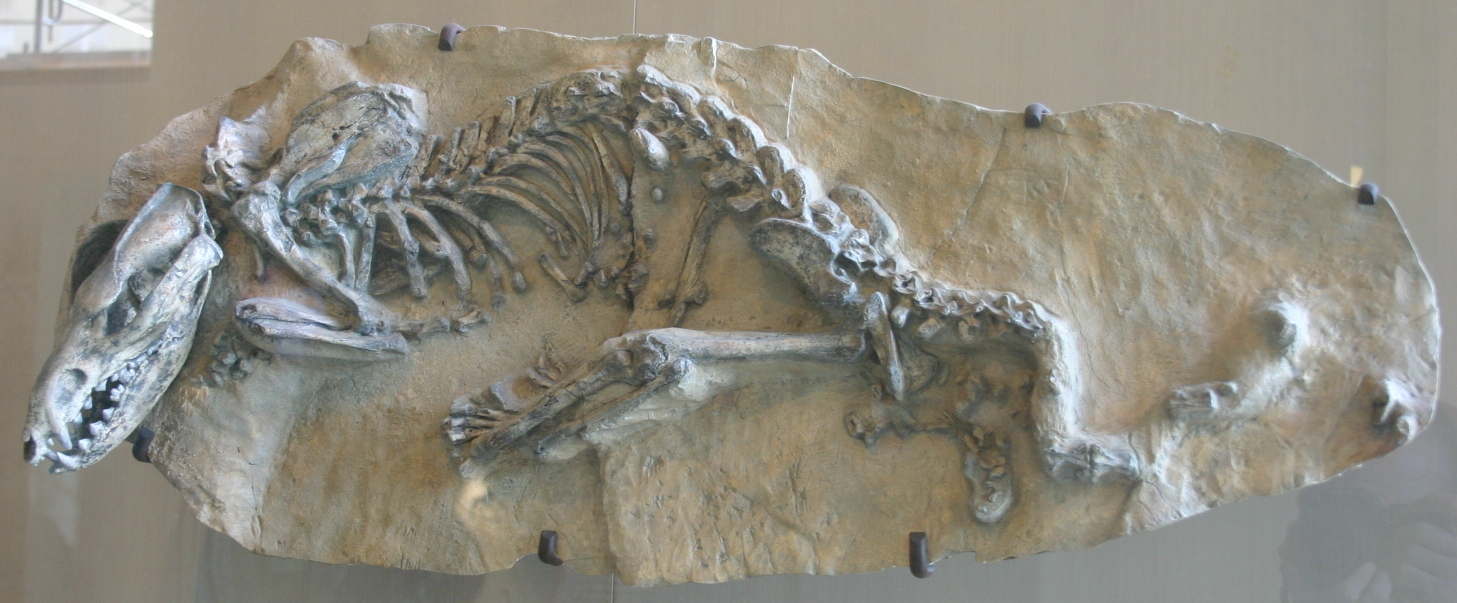
- Fossil of L. longirostrus at the American Museum of Natural History.

Scientific classification
- Kingdom: Animalia
- Phylum: Chordata
- Class: Mammalia
- Order: †Sparassodonta
- Superfamily: †Borhyaenoidea
- Genus: †Lycopsis; Cabrera 1927

Type species
- †Lycopsis torresi Cabrera 1927

Other species
- L. longirostris Marshall 1976; L. viverensis Forasiepi et al. 2003

Synonyms
- Anatherium oxyrhynchus Ameghino 1894

= Lycopsis =

Lycopsis Temporal range: Mid-Late Miocene (Santacrucian-Chasicoan) ~16.3–9.0 Ma

Extinct marsupial-like mammal genus

Lycopsis is an extinct genus of South American metatherian that lived during the Miocene in Argentina and Colombia.

== History ==
Although not named until 1927, Florentino Ameghino described a species now seen as synonymous with Lycopsis torresi, Anatherium oxyrhynchus, in 1895 based on a mandibular ramus with several teeth. The fossil was recovered from Puesto Estancia La Costa in Santa Cruz, Argentina, dating to the Miocene. The type material of Lycopsis was collected in July 1895 by "C. Berry" from the middle Miocene strata of the Santa Cruz Formation along the Santa Cruz River in the same area. The fossils (MLP 11–113) were fragmentary, constituting only several fragmentary jaw sections from the maxilla and mandible, including several molars. However, these fossils were not named until in 1927, Ángel Cabrera named Lycopsis torresi, the generic name meaning "wolf-like aspect" after the anatomy of the mandible and the specific name after Argentine paleontologist and the director of the Museo de la Plata at the time, Luis Maria Torres.

== Taxonomy ==
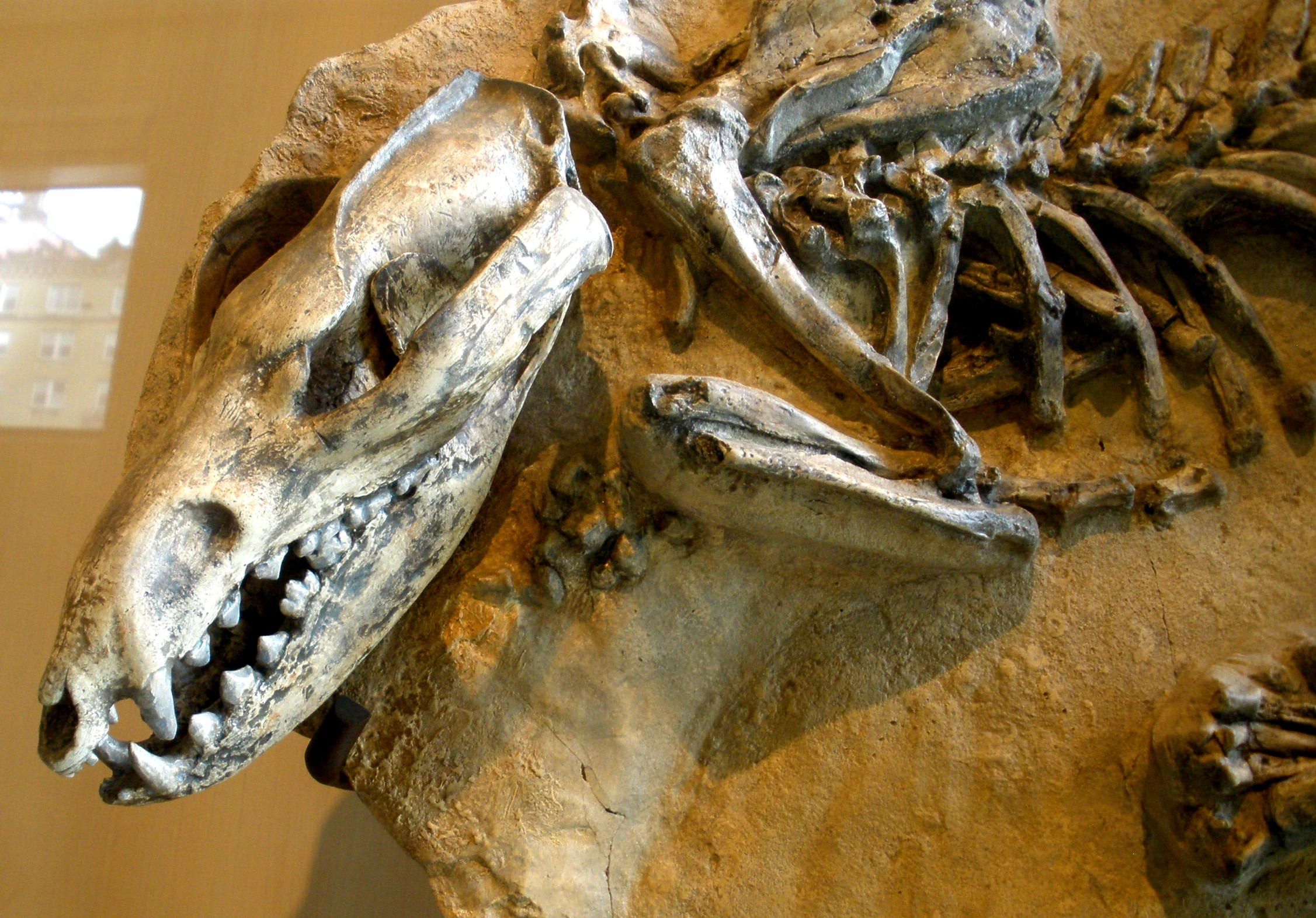
Skull of Lycopsis

The cladogram after the analysis of Suárez et al., 2015, looks as follows:

- Sparassodonta
  - Patene
  - - Hondadelphys
    - - Stylocynus
      - - Hathliacynidae
          - Acyon
          - - Cladosictis
            - - Sipalocyon
              - - Notogale
                - Sallacyon
        - Borhyaenoidea
          - Lycopsis
            - Lycopsis longirostrus
            - - Lycopsis viverensis
              - - Lycopsis torresi
                - Lycopsis padillai
          - - Prothylacynus
            - - Pharsophorus
              - - Borhyaenidae
                  - Borhyaena
                  - - Australohyaena
                    - - Arctodictis sinclairi
                      - Arctodictis munizi
                - - Callistoe
                  - - Paraborhyaena
                    - Thylacosmilidae
                      - Patagosmilus
                      - Thylacosmilus

== Description ==
L. longirostrus weighed 15 kg (33 lb) and stood 35 cm (1 ft 2 in) at the shoulders. L. padilli slightly larger, weighing around 22 kg (49 lb), making this species the largest mammalian predator of its time.

== Distribution and habitat ==
Fossils of Lycopsis have been found in:

- Arroyo Chasicó Formation and Santa Cruz Formations, Argentina
- Honda Group, Colombia

Isotopic analysis suggests that L. viverensis lived in less open environments than its distant relative, Thylacosmilus. On the other hand, L. longirostrus is believed to have inhabited a densely forested habitat. This is further supported by the lack of the remains of terror birds.

== Paleobiology ==
A 2004 study found the forelimbs of L. longirostrus were not adapted for frequent climbing and instead were better used for manipulating behavior such as foraging and feeding. Carbon isotope values suggests L. viverensis may have preyed upon rodents such as Cardiatherium and Tetrastylus and the litoperns Cullinia and Theosodon.
