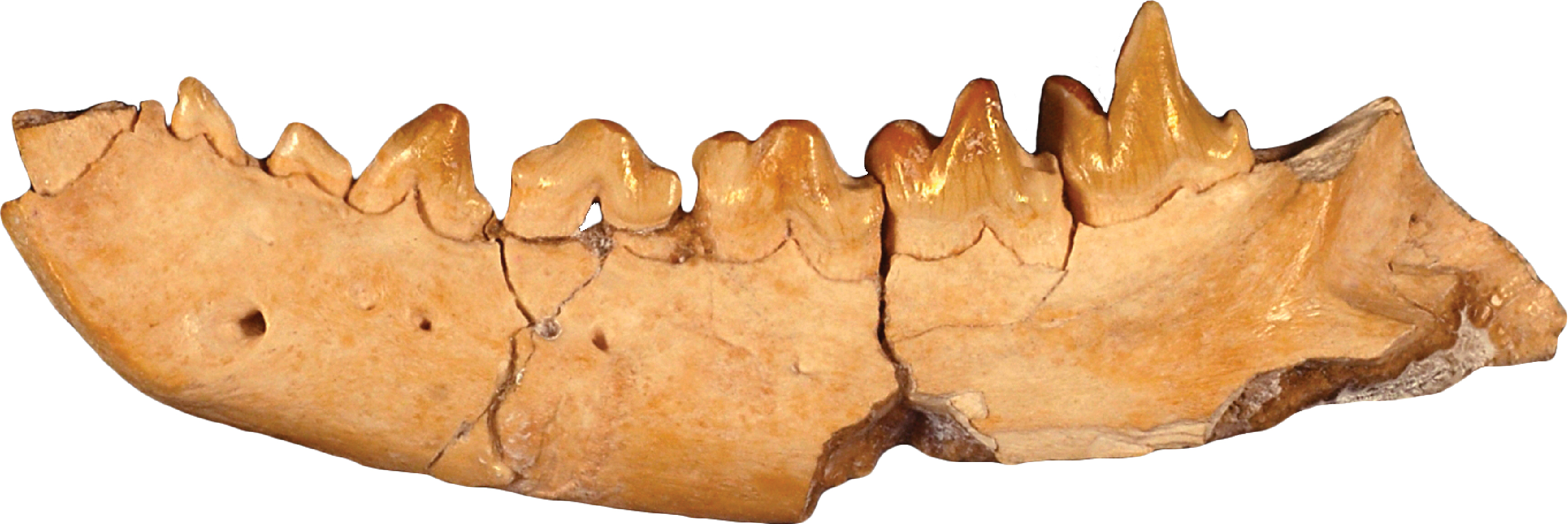
- Holotype specimen

Scientific classification
- Kingdom: Animalia
- Phylum: Chordata
- Class: Mammalia
- Order: †Sparassodonta
- Clade: †Thylacosmiliformes
- Genus: †Dimartinia; Suarez et al., 2025
- Species: †D. pristina

Binomial name
- †Dimartinia pristina Suarez et al., 2025

= Dimartinia =

Dimartinia Temporal range: Late Miocene (Chasicoan [SALMA]), 9.7–8.7 Ma

Extinct mammal genus

Dimartinia (after Vicente Di Martino) is an extinct genus of carnivorous sparassodont metatherian mammal from the Late Miocene Cerro Azul Formation of Argentina. The genus contains a single species, Dimartinia pristina, known from a left mandible and teeth. Dimartinia is a 'primitive' member of the Thylacosmiliformes, a group also containing the more derived saber-toothed thylacosmilids.

== Discovery and naming ==
The Dimartinia pristina holotype specimen, MMH-CH 87-7-111, was discovered in sediments of the Cerro Azul Formation ('Arroyo Chasicó' locality) in Buenos Aires Province, Argentina. The specimen consists of a left dentary and its associated teeth (partial canine, first–third premolars, and first–fourth molars).

In 2025, Catalina Suarez and colleagues described Dimartinia pristina as a new genus and species of metatherian mammals based on these fossil remains. The generic name, Dimartinia, honors Vicente Di Martino, the collector of the holotype and founder of the museum where the specimen is accessioned. The specific name, pristina, is derived from the Latin word pristinus, meaning "primitive", "early", or "original", referencing the anatomy and relationships of this taxon.

== Description ==
Based on the morphology of its teeth and the more complete remains of related animals, Dimartinia is recognized as a hypercarnivorous predator. It is fairly small, with an estimated body mass of 3.22 kilograms (7.1 lb). This makes it notably smaller than the related thylacosmilids (ranging from 16–117 kilograms (35–258 lb)) and other sparassodonts from the type locality (8–19 kilograms (18–42 lb)).

The anatomy of the holotype specimen indicates features shared with members of the Thylacosmilidae. However, it also has more 'primitive' and generalized features, such as a more shallow dentary and less vertical lower canines, suggesting a more basal phylogenetic position relative to these animals.

Two linear lesions are visible on the dentary. These may have been caused by a predation attempt on the holotype individual by a larger animal such as a larger sparassodont or phorusrhacid. Alternatively, it may have resulted from aggressive intraspecific agonistic behavior. This injury likely impacted the animal's ability to hunt and feed, which may have ultimately resulted in its death. Based on visible periosteal reaction (new bone formation), the individual may have lived at least 15 days following the injury's occurrence.

== Classification ==
In their phylogenetic analyses, Suarez et al. (2025) recovered Dimartinia as the basalmost member of a sparassodont mammal clade containing the Thylacosmilidae. They named this group the Thylacosmiliformes, which also contains an unnamed taxon from La Venta, Colombia. Their results are displayed in the cladogram below:

- Borhyaenoidea
  - Lycopsis spp.
  - - Thylacosmiliformes
      - Dimartinia
      - - IGM 251108
          (unnamed La Venta taxon)
        - Thylacosmilidae
          - Thylacosmilus
          - - Anachlysictis
            - Patagosmilus
    - - UF 27881
        (unnamed Honda Group sparassodont)
      - - Prothylacynus
        - - Pharsophorus lacerans
          - - Eomakhaira
            - - Proborhyaenidae
              - Borhyaenidae
