= Dukecynus =

Dukecynus Temporal range: Mid-Miocene (Laventan) ~13.8–11.8 Ma
- Fossil illustration

Scientific classification
- Kingdom: Animalia
- Phylum: Chordata
- Class: Mammalia
- Order: †Sparassodonta
- Superfamily: †Borhyaenoidea
- Genus: †Dukecynus; Goin, 1997

Species
- Dukecynus magnus

Extinct genus of large meat-eating metatherian

Dukecynus is an extinct genus of meat-eating metatherian belonging to the order Sparassodonta, which lived in South America during the Middle Miocene (Laventan), between about 13.8 and 11.8 million years ago. The name of the genus meaning "Duke dog", for Duke University and the Greek word cynos, dog, for the pretended similarity of this animal with dogs. A single species known so far, Dukecynus magnus. The species name "magnus" derives from Latin for big, to reflect their great size.

== Description ==
Dukecynus is only known from its holotype, IGM 251149, a heavily damaged partial skull preserving parts of the lower and upper jaw as well as associated fragments of the skeleton. This specimen was discovered at the Konzentrat-Lagerstätte La Venta in the Honda Group, Huila and Tolima in Colombia. A second fragmentary specimen from La Venta, cataloged as UCMP 39250, consisting of a fragmentary skull and parts of the humerus and femur from a juvenile individual, referred to "cf. Arctodictis" by Marshall (1978) could also belong to Dukecynus or a similar species. Although the affinities of this species have never been formally analysed, Dukecynus is generally considered to be a basal borhyaenoid, a paraphyletic group of sparassodonts that includes genera like Lycopsis and Prothylacynus that cannot be assigned to one of the major borhyaenoid families like Borhyaenidae or Thylacosmilidae. Compared to other basal borhyaenoids, Dukecynus had a long, narrow snout and was relatively large, with some estimates suggesting this animal weighed up to 68 kilograms (150 lb). Dukecynus was probably the largest mammalian predator as well as the largest sparassodont at La Venta.
