= Gurlin Tsav skull =

Unidentified fossil

The "Gurlin Tsav" skull is a currently unnamed carnivorous metatherian fossil from the Nemegt Formation of Mongolia. Composed of a single semi-complete skull, this specimen is notable in regards to the evolution and systematics of Metatheria as a whole, and thus nigh-omnipresent in phylogenetic analyses of this group. The skull is described as 6.8cm long.

== Fossil location ==
The Gurlin Tsav skull, as the informal name indicates, comes from the Gurlin Tsav track in the Nemegt Formation. This area represents fluvial deposits, and also heralds a few dinosaur specimens, such as a Saurolophus skeleton.

== Classification ==
The specimen was originally referred to Deltatheroida, a clade of carnivorous metatherians rather common in the Cretaceous of Asia. However, one study by Guillermo Rougier has found it to lack the group's synapomorphies and instead resemble the American stagodontids more closely.

Posterior phylogenetic studies have indeed recovered this specimen as being closer to the Marsupialiformes line than to Deltatheroida. However, instead of being close to stagodontids, the Gurlin Tsav skull usually groups outside of a clade leading to South American metatherians (and, consequently, to marsupials). It is nearly always an immediate outgroup to sparassodonts.

Most recently, it has been found to group with sparassodonts and other Paleocene non-marsupial metatherians from South America. It and these taxa from a group independent from not only Deltatheroida, but also a North American clade where true marsupials are nested as well as stagodontids.

- Marsupialiformes
  - - Gurlin Tsav skull
    - - Borhyaenidae
      - - Mayulestes
        - - Jaskhadelphys
          - - Andinodelphys
            - Pucadelphys
  - - Asiatherium
    - - - Iugomortiferum
        - Kokopellia
      - Aenigmadelphys
      - Anchistodelphys
      - - Glasbiidae
          Glasbius
        - Pediomyidae
          Pediomys
      - Stagodontidae
        - Pariadens
        - - Eodelphis
          - Didelphodon
      - Alphadontidae
        - Turgidodon
        - Alphadon
        - Albertatherium
      - Marsupialia
