= Fredszalaya =

Fredszalaya Temporal range: Late Oligocene (Deseadan) 25 Ma

Scientific classification
- Kingdom: Animalia
- Phylum: Chordata
- Class: Mammalia
- Order: †Sparassodonta
- Family: †Borhyaenidae
- Genus: †Fredszalaya; Shockey & Anaya, 2008

Type species
- Fredszalaya hunteri Shockey & Anaya, 2008

Extinct family of mammals

Fredszalaya is an extinct genus of omnivorous mammal, belonging to the order Sparassodonta. It lived during the Late Oligocene, and its fossilized remains were discovered in South America.

== Description ==
It was a relatively small-sized animal, compared with some of its relatives such as Borhyaena. Its fossils show an animal the size of a modern jackal, with large and grinding molars whose protrusions and cusps were not reduced. The shape of its heels indicates that Fredszalaya was able to climb trees, unlike Borhyaena. Its muzzle was rather short, and its dentition was quite robust.

== Classification ==
Fredszalaya was first described in 2008, based on fossils found in the Salla Formation in Bolivia. The description study indicates that it was quite closely related to Borhyaena, mainly based on the shape of the alisphenoid. It is still unclear, however, if Fredszalaya had a morphology similar to Borhyaena. Fredszalaya was part of the Borhyaenidae, a clade of South American predatory sparassodonts.

== Paleobiology ==
Fredszalaya seems to have been an animal as well adapted for climbing than for life on the ground. Its teeth indicates that it was omnivorous.
