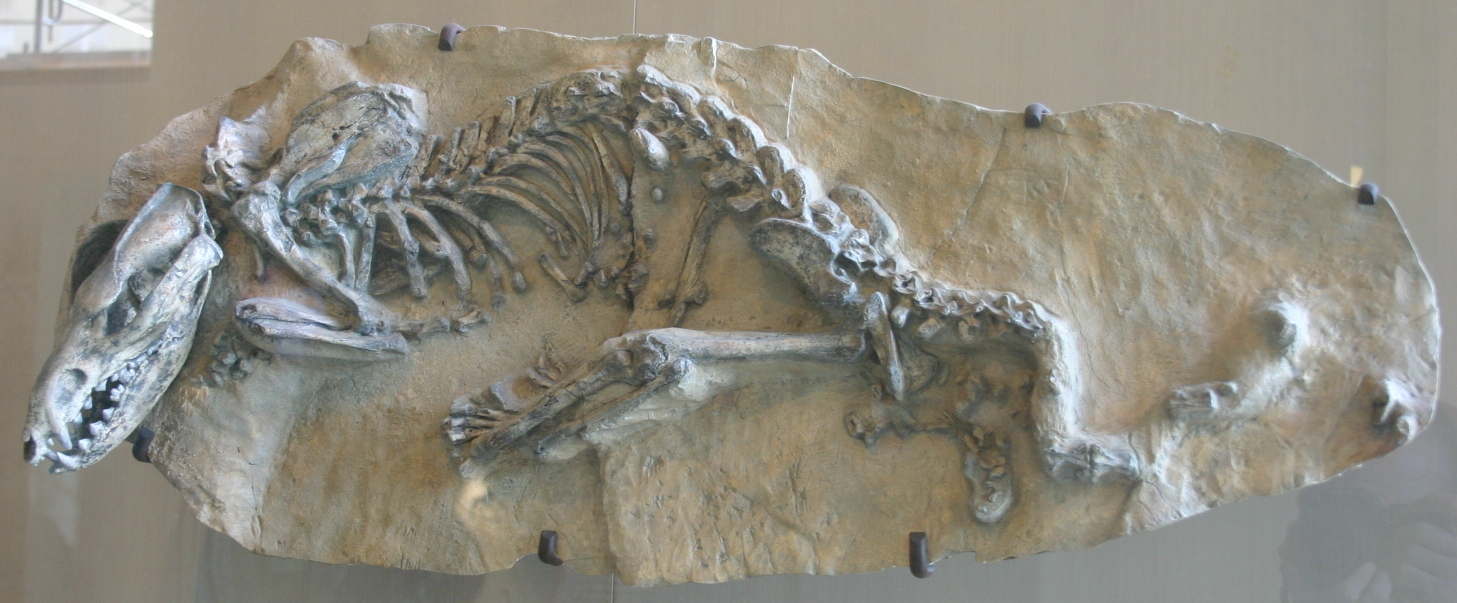
- Lycopsis
- Life restoration of Thylacosmilus

Scientific classification
- Kingdom: Animalia
- Phylum: Chordata
- Class: Mammalia
- Clade: Metatheria
- Clade: Marsupialiformes
- Order: †Sparassodonta; Ameghino, 1894

Families
- †Borhyaenidae †Hathliacynidae †Hondadelphidae †Mayulestidae †Proborhyaenidae †Thylacosmilidae

= Sparassodonta =

Sparassodonta Temporal range: Early Paleocene to Early Pleistocene, 65–2 Ma Suspected Late Cretaceous origin

Extinct order of mammals

Sparassodonta (from Greek σπαράσσειν [sparasseing], to tear, rend; and ὀδούς, gen. ὀδόντος [odous, odontos], tooth) is an extinct order of carnivorous metatherian mammals related to modern marsupials. They were once considered to be true marsupials, but are now thought to be a separate side branch that split before the last common ancestor of all modern marsupials. Fossils of the order have been found exclusive to South America, although trackways suggests they were possibly present in Antarctica.

A number of these mammalian predators closely resemble placental predators that evolved separately on other continents, and are cited frequently as examples of convergent evolution. They were first described by Florentino Ameghino, from fossils found in the Santa Cruz beds of Patagonia. Sparassodonts were present throughout South America's long period of "splendid isolation" during the Cenozoic; during this time, they shared the niches for large warm-blooded predators with the flightless terror birds. It has historically been suggested tha these mammals died out in the face of competition from "more competitive" placental carnivorans during the Great American Interchange, but more recent research has shown that sparassodonts had already substantially declined and died before the appearance of their placental analogues. The last known sparassodont, Pampaluctor, lived alongside invading placental carnivores such as canids and mustelids.

Sparassodonts have been referred to as borhyaenoids by some authors, but currently the term Borhyaenoidea refers to a restricted subgroup of sparassodonts comprising borhyaenids and their close relatives.

== Anatomy ==
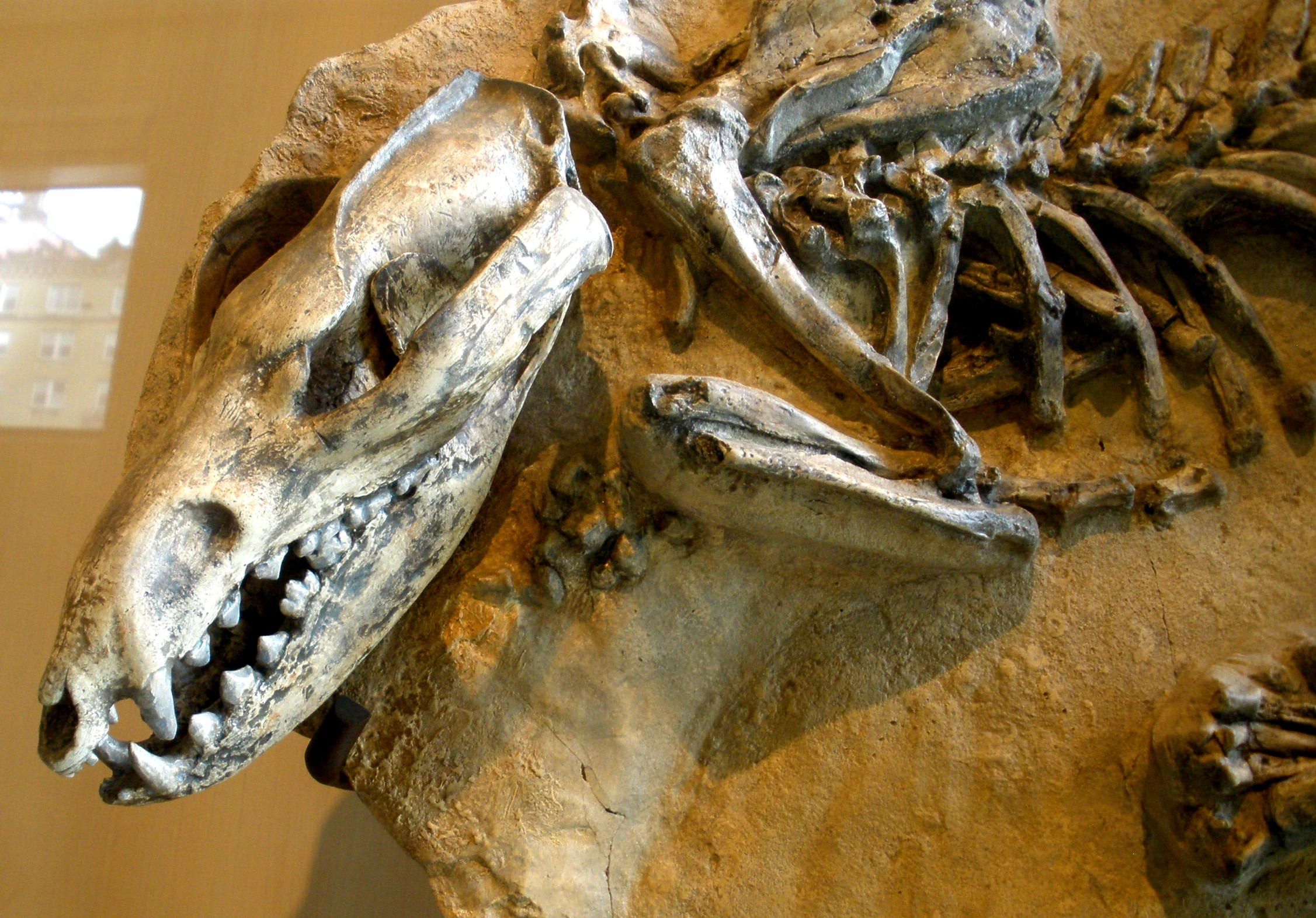
The skeleton of Lycopsis longirostrus, from the late middle Miocene of Colombia

Almost all sparassodonts have an exceptionally shortened snout—most especially thylacosmylids. Hathliacynids usually have a longer snout than the other groups. The nasal bones extend past the eye sockets, often reaching the lacrimal bone. Except for thylacosmylids beyond Patagosmilus, sparassodonts feature an open eye socket, with more marginalized (though nonetheless prominent) postorbital processes which would otherwise form the postorbital bar connecting the forehead to the cheek, thus framing the eye. They exhibit marked postorbital constriction. The orbital process (between the cheek and the eye socket) is usually diminished, though the zygomatic arch (the cheekbone) is strong. They feature a prominent sagittal crest along the midline of the flattened skull, the crest strength is quite variable among borhyaenids. They have an expanded occipital bone with a well defined nuchal crest.

Sparassodonts spanned a wide range of body sizes, from 2.2-pound (1 kg) weasel or civet-like forms to Thylacosmilus, which was the size of a leopard. The largest known sparassodont was Proborhyaena which was about the size of a spectacled bear. Along with the Australian thylacoleonids, sparassodonts include some of the largest metatherian carnivores.

Sparassodonts have highly reduced epipubic bones (pelvic bones which support the pouch), to the point that early analysis could not even find evidence for them. This is a characteristic shared with the Australian thylacine, and historically argued as a synapomorphy, though nowadays it is considered to have developed independently for poorly understood reasons. As with thylacines, it is very likely that they possessed long cartilaginous elements instead.

=== Teeth ===
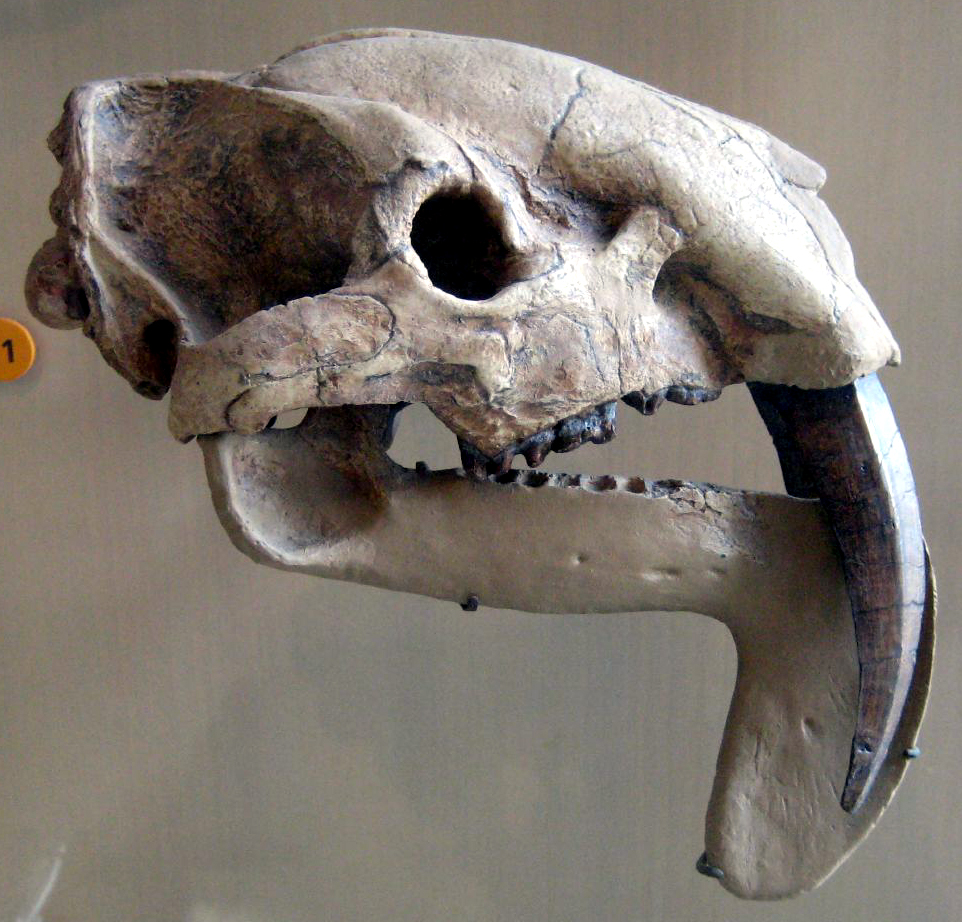
Thylacosmilus had long sabers.

The dental formula of sparassodonts varies considerably. In borhyaenids, it is 3.1.3.43.1.3.4, with three upper and lower incisors, one upper and lower canine, three upper and lower premolars, and four upper and lower molars in each half of either jaw. Proborhyaenids usually only have two lower incisors instead of three, except for Callistoe. Thylacosmylids have at least two upper and only two lower incisors (the uppers grew into elongated sabers), and two upper and lower premolars. Some specimens of Borhyaena and Arctodictis are also missing the last upper molar, showing that the presence of this tooth was variable in these species.

Sparassodonta is characterized by dental synapomorphies that distinguish the group from other closely related mammals. Unequivocal traits uniting the earliest Sparassodonts include:

- a snout that forms a pronounced bulge around the canine teeth when viewed from above
- a ridge on the upper molar (preparacrista) oriented anterobuccally (towards the cheek) with respect to the long axis of the tooth.
- a pronounced keel near the base of the front of the paraconid
- ridges on lower molars (postprotocristid-metacristid) parallel or oblique with respect to lower jaw axis.
- a very tall protoconid (>90% tooth length, secondarily lost in Hondadelphys and Stylocynus) that bulges to the side and is wider at its midpoint than its base
- talonid (crushing end) of lower molar narrow in relation to trigonid (shearing end).

In borhyaenids, only the third premolar was ever replaced in the animal's lifetime, similar to other metatherians. In thylacosmilids, only the lower third premolar was replaced.

The cusps of the sparassodont molar correlate to a cutting function rather than a crushing one. In the upper molars, the paracone (on the lingual, or tongueward, side) is reduced and fused to the metacone (distal, towards the back of the mouth), inflating the postmetacrista (the lingual border of the metacone); and they almost always lack the stylar shelf (on the buccal, or cheekward, side) and associated stylar cusps. In the lower molars, the trigonids (the buccal shearing side) have an inflated paracristid and marginalized or absent metaconid; and the talonid (the distal, or backendwards, crushing side) is either reduced or gone.

== Taxonomy ==
=== Classification ===
Sparassodonts can be divided into six major groups; basal sparassodonts (?earliest Paleocene–late Miocene), species that cannot be easily assigned to any of the other sparassodont groups and whose teeth often exhibit adaptations for omnivory; hathliacynids (late Oligocene–early Pliocene/late Pliocene), which range from a marten to a thylacine in size, and have long, fox-like muzzles and teeth strongly suited for carnivory; basal borhyaenoids (middle Eocene–late Miocene), borhyaenoids which are unable to be easily classified into the families Borhyaenidae, Thylacosmilidae, or Proborhyaenidae and range in form and size; borhyaenids (early–late Miocene), the sparassodont group most specialized for running, but not as much as living carnivorans or even thylacines; proborhyaenids (middle Eocene–late Oligocene), robust, wolverine-like forms with ever-growing upper and lower canines; and thylacosmilids (early Miocene–early Pleistocene), another terrestrially specialized group with ever-growing saber-like upper canines.

The taxonomic classification below follows the latest review of the group, that of Prevosti and Forasiepi (2018), with additions from more recent studies. Although Mayulestes was originally described as a sparassodont, later phylogenetic analyses have shown that it most likely does not belong to this group; however more recent studies show it to be closely related to sparassodonts. Similarly, while basal borhyaenoids such as Lycopsis and Prothylacynus were once thought to belong to a distinct family (Prothylacynidae), phylogenetic analyses have found that these animals do not represent a monophyletic group. The exact age of most Eocene species of sparassodonts is uncertain, given the lack of precise stratigraphic information associated with most specimens and the recent division of the Casamayoran SALMA into the Vacan and Barrancan SALMAs.

- Order Sparassodonta
  - Genus Allqokirus
    - Allqokirus australis (earliest Paleocene, Tiupampan SALMA)
  - Genus Mayulestes
    - Mayulestes ferox (earliest Paleocene, Tiupampan SALMA)
  - Genus Argyrolestes
  - Genus Nemolestes
    - Nemolestes spalacotherinus (late middle Eocene, Barrancan SALMA)
  - Genus Patene
    - Patene campbelli (late ?Eocene, Santa Rosa local fauna)
    - Patene coloradensis (middle Eocene)
    - Patene coluapiensis (middle Eocene, Barrancan SALMA)
    - Patene simpsoni (late Paleocene/early Eocene, Itaboraian SALMA)
  - Genus Procladosictis
    - Procladosictis anomala (late Eocene, Mustersan SALMA)
  - Family Hondadelphidae
    - Genus Hondadelphys
      - Hondadelphys fieldsi (late middle Miocene, Laventan SALMA)
    - Genus Stylocynus
      - Stylocynus paranensis (latest Miocene, Huayquerian SALMA)
  - Family Hathliacynidae
    - Genus Acyon
      - Acyon ?herrerae (early Miocene, Colhuehuapian SALMA)
      - Acyon myctoderos (late middle Miocene, Laventan SALMA)
      - Acyon tricuspidatus (late early Miocene, Santacrucian SALMA)
    - Genus Australogale
      - Australogale leptognathus (late middle Miocene, Laventan SALMA)
    - Genus Borhyaenidium
      - Borhyaenidium altiplanicus (latest Miocene, Huayquerian SALMA)
      - Borhyaenidium riggsi (unknown, either early or late Pliocene, Montehermosan or Chapadmalalan SALMA)
      - Borhyaenidium musteloides (latest Miocene, Huayquerian SALMA)
    - Genus Chasicostylus
      - Chasicostylus castroi (early late Miocene, Chasicoan SALMA)
    - Genus Cladosictis
      - Cladosictis centralis (early Miocene, Colhuehuapian SALMA)
      - Cladosictis patagonica (late early to earliest middle Miocene, Santacrucian-Friasian SALMA)
    - Genus Notictis
      - Notictis ortizi (latest Miocene, Huayquerian SALMA)
    - Genus Notocynus
      - Notocynus hermosicus (early Pliocene, Montehermosan SALMA)
    - Genus Notogale
      - Notogale mitis (late Oligocene, Deseadan SALMA)
    - Genus Pseudonotictis
      - Pseudonotictis chubutensis (early middle Miocene, Colloncuran SALMA)
      - Pseudonotictis pusillus (late early Miocene, Santacrucian SALMA)
    - Genus Perathereutes
      - Perathereutes pungens (late early Miocene, Santacrucian SALMA)
    - Genus Sallacyon
      - Sallacyon hoffstetteri (late Oligocene, Deseadan SALMA)
    - Genus Sipalocyon
      - Sipalocyon externus (early Miocene, Colhuehuapian SALMA)
      - Sipalocyon gracilis (late early Miocene, Santacrucian SALMA)
      - Sipalocyon "obusta" (late early Miocene, Santacrucian SALMA)
  - Superfamily Borhyaenoidea
    - Genus Angelocabrerus
      - Angelocabrerus daptes (middle Eocene)
    - Genus Chlorocyon
      - Chlorocyon phantasma (late Eocene, Mustersan SALMA)
    - Genus Dukecynus
      - Dukecynus magnus (late middle Miocene, Laventan SALMA)
    - Genus Eomakhaira
      - Eomakhaira molossus (early Oligocene, ?Tinguirirican SALMA)
    - Genus Fredszalaya
      - Fredszalaya hunteri (late Oligocene, Deseadan SALMA)
    - Genus Lycopsis
      - Lycopsis longirostrus (late middle Miocene, Laventan SALMA)
      - Lycopsis padillai (middle Miocene, Colloncuran SALMA)
      - Lycopsis torresi (early Miocene, Colhuehuapian SALMA)
      - Lycopsis viverensis (early late Miocene, Chasicoan SALMA))
    - Genus Pharsophorus
      - Pharsophorus lacerans (middle to late Oligocene, La Cantera Local Fauna to Deseadan SALMA)
      - Pharsophorus tenax (late Oligocene, Deseadan SALMA)
    - Genus Plesiofelis
      - Plesiofelis schlosseri (late Eocene, Mustersan SALMA)
    - Genus Prothylacynus
      - Prothylacynus patagonicus (late early to earliest middle Miocene, Santacrucian-Friasian SALMA)
    - Genus Pseudolycopsis
      - Pseudolycopsis cabrerai (early late Miocene, Chasicoan SALMA
    - Genus Pseudothylacynus
      - Pseudothylacynus rectus (early Miocene, Colhuehuapian SALMA)
    - Family Borhyaenidae
      - Genus Acrocyon
        - Acrocyon riggsi (early Miocene, Colhuehuapian SALMA)
        - Acrocyon sectorius (late early Miocene, Santacrucian SALMA)
      - Genus Arctodictis
        - Arctodictis munizi (late early Miocene, Santacrucian SALMA)
        - Arctodictis sinclairi (early Miocene, Colhuehuapian SALMA)
      - Genus Australohyaena
        - Australohyaena antiquua (late Oligocene, Deseadan SALMA)
      - Genus Borhyaena
        - Borhyaena macrodonta (early Miocene, Colhuehuapian SALMA)
        - Borhyaena tuberata (late early Miocene, Santacrucian SALMA)
      - ?Genus Eutemnodus
    - Family Proborhyaenidae
      - Genus Arminiheringia
      - Genus Callistoe
        - Callistoe vincei (middle Eocene, Vacan-Barrancan SALMA)
      - Genus Paraborhyaena
        - Paraborhyaena boliviana (late Oligocene, Deseadan SALMA)
      - Genus Proborhyaena
        - Proborhyaena gigantea (late Oligocene, Deseadan SALMA)
    - Unranked clade Thylacosmiliformes
      - Genus Dimartinia
        - Dimartinia pristina (late Miocene, Chasicoan SALMA)
      - Family Thylacosmilidae
        - Genus Anachlysictis
          - Anachlysictis gracilis (late middle Miocene, Laventan SALMA)
        - Genus Pampaluctor
          - Pampaluctor calibar (late Pliocene–early Pleistocene, Marplatan SALMA)
        - Genus Patagosmilus
          - Patagosmilus goini (early middle Miocene, Colloncuran SALMA)
        - Genus Thylacosmilus
          - Thylacosmilus atrox (latest Miocene to late Pliocene, Huayquerian-Chapadmalalan SALMA)

Several other metatherian taxa have been suggested to be sparassodonts or closely related to sparassodonts. The australian Murgon taxa Archaeonothos has been noted as being similar to sparassodonts, but currently its relationships are not fully concluded. Carneiro (2018) recovered the genus Varalphadon from the Late Cretaceous of North America as a basal member of Sparassodonta. However, this interpretation of Varalphadon as a sparassodont has not been supported by later phylogenetic analyses, and most of the purported synapomorphies between Varalphadon and sparassodonts are not actually present in Varalphadon or have been suggested to be due to convergent evolution. Sparassodonts have sometimes been considered closely related to the "Gurlin Tsav skull" an unnamed metatherian known from a partial skull found in the Late Cretaceous Nemegt Formation of Mongolia.

The following cladogram of sparassodont interrelationships is after Engelman et al., 2020. Not all studies agree on the sister group relationship between Thylacosmilidae and Borhyaenidae recovered here, with other studies finding thylacosmilids to be within Proborhyaenidae. The relationships among hathliacynids are also relatively unstable.

- Sparassodonta
  - - Allqokirus
    - Mayulestes
  - - Patene
    - - Hondadelphidae
        - Hondadelphys
        - Stylocynus
      - - Hathliacynidae
          - - Cladosictis
            - Acyon
          - - Sipalocyon
            - Notogale
            - Sallacyon
        - Borhyaenoidea
          - Lycopsis longirostrus
          - - Lycopsis viverensis
            - Lycopsis torresi
            - Lycopsis padillai
          - - Prothylacynus
            - Pharsophorus
            - - Borhyaenidae
                - Borhyaena
                - - Australohyaena
                  - - Arctodictis sinclairi
                    - Arctodictis munizi
              - Proborhyaenidae
                - Callistoe
                - - - Paraborhyaena
                    - Proborhyaena
                  - Thylacosmilinae
                    - Eomakhaira
                    - - Patagosmilus
                      - Thylacosmilus

Cladogram of Borhyaenoidea after del Campo et al. (2026) using the matrix of Suarez et al. (2025), who coined the clade Thylacosmiliformes to encompass Thylacosmilidae and their more basal relatives:

- †Borhyaenoidea
  - Lycopsis spp.
  - - Thylacosmiliformes
      - Dimartinia
      - - IGM 251108
        - Thylacosmilidae
          - - Pampaluctor
            - Thylacosmilus
          - - Anachlysictis
            - Patagosmilus
    - - UF 27881 (unnamed Honda Group sparassodont)
      - - Prothylacynus
        - - Pharsophorus
          - - Eomakhaira
            - - Proborhyaenidae
              - Borhyaenidae

Within Metatheria, a 2016 phylogenetic analysis found that borhyaenids form a clade with the Asian "Gurlin Tsav skull" as well as other South American taxa. The same phylogeny found that marsupials group among various North American Cretaceous species. The phylogenetic tree is reproduced below.

- Marsupialiformes
  - - Gurlin Tsav skull
    - - Borhyaenidae
      - - Mayulestes
        - - Jaskhadelphys
          - - Andinodelphys
            - Pucadelphys
  - - Asiatherium
    - - - Iugomortiferum
        - Kokopellia
      - Aenigmadelphys
      - Anchistodelphys
      - - Glasbiidae
          Glasbius
        - Pediomyidae
          Pediomys
      - Stagodontidae
        - Pariadens
        - - Eodelphis
          - Didelphodon
      - Alphadontidae
        - Turgidodon
        - Alphadon
        - Albertatherium
      - Marsupialia

=== Evolution ===
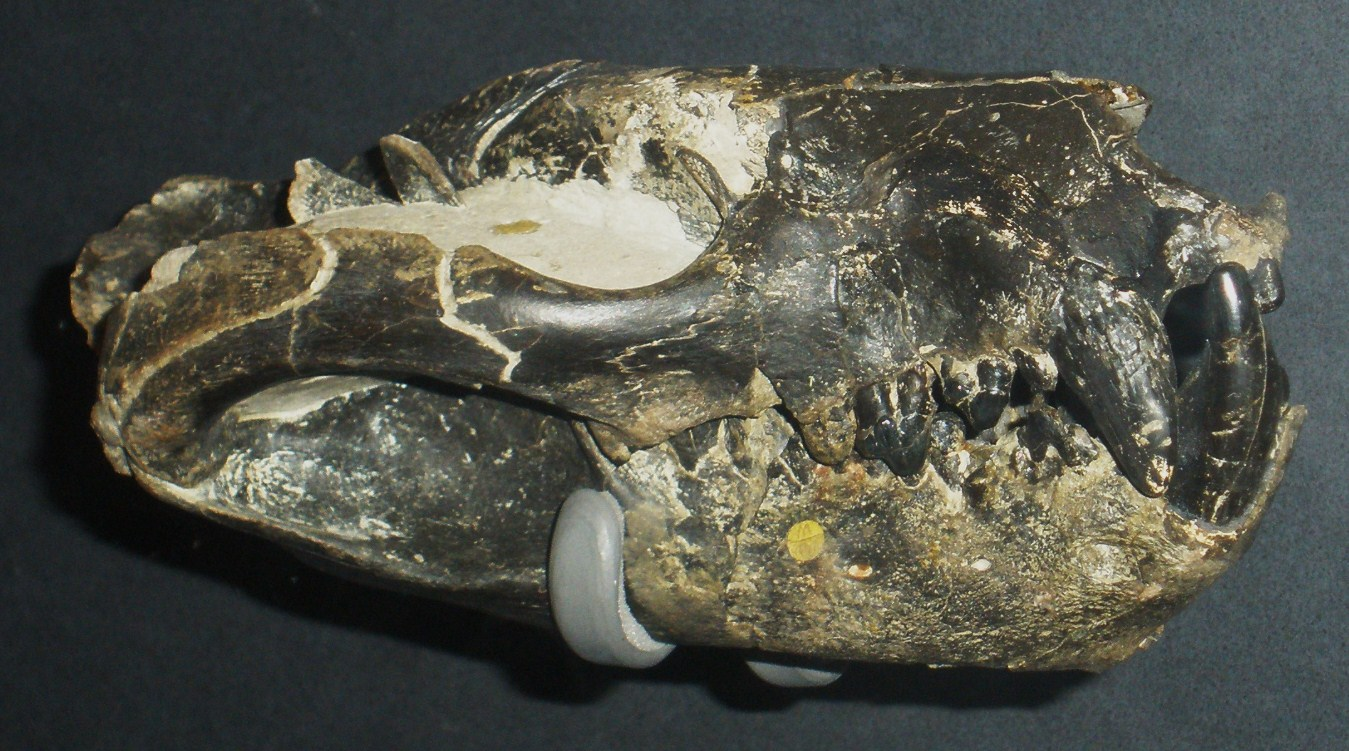
Skull of Borhyaena (Borhyaenidae)

The early history of the Sparassodonta is poorly known, as most Paleocene and Eocene members of this group are only known from isolated teeth and fragmentary jaws. However, one species, the middle Eocene Callistoe vincei, is known from a nearly complete, articulated skeleton. As Callistoe belongs to one of the most specialized groups of sparassodonts, this indicates that the other major groups (e.g. borhyaenids, hathliacynids, etc.) must have also arisen by this time. Originally, the early Paleocene metatherian Mayulestes was considered to be the earliest known member of the Sparassodonta, but phylogenetic analyses suggest that this species represents an independent radiation of carnivorous metatherians more closely related to Pucadelphys; however, recent studies show that these taxa were closely related to borhyaenids. As of this writing, the earliest known true sparassodonts are either Allqokirus australis, a species from the same site as Mayulestes that may turn out to not be a sparassodont, and an isolated astragalus from the earliest Paleocene site of Punta Peligro, Argentina.

Sparassodonts have been suggested to be related to a variety of other groups of metatherians. Florentino Ameghino, who first described fossils of the group, thought that sparassodonts were closely related to creodonts and were a transitional group between metatherians and carnivorous placentals (including modern carnivorans). Contemporary authors in the late 19th and early 20th century rejected this hypothesis and considered sparassodonts to be closely related to Australian thylacines and dasyurids. The most popular hypothesis for much of the 20th century was that sparassodonts were closely related to opossums. In 1990, Marshall et al. (1990) considered the Cretaceous stagodontids to be members of Sparassodonta, but this was criticized by later authors. Marshall and Kielan-Jaworowska (1992) considered sparassodonts to be closely related to deltatheroidans, but this was also criticized. Most of these hypotheses were based on similar adaptations for carnivorous diets in sparassodonts, opossums, dasyuromorphians, stagodonts, and deltatheroidans, which are highly prone to convergent evolution within mammals. Szalay (1994) considered sparassodonts to be closely related to paucituberculatans based on features of the ankle. In recent years there has been a growing consensus that sparassodonts are positioned just outside of crown-group Marsupialia, in a broader clade (Pucadelphyida) including pucadelphyids as well as sparassodonts.

Initially, sparassodonts are presently regarded as an endemic South American group, and have not even been found in nearby continents like Antarctica (where other groups native to South America such as litopterns, astrapotheres, microbiotheres, and polydolopids) are present. However, fossil trackways suggests a hathliacynid ichnotaxon was present on Seymour Island during the Early Eocene.

== Paleobiology ==
=== Ecology ===
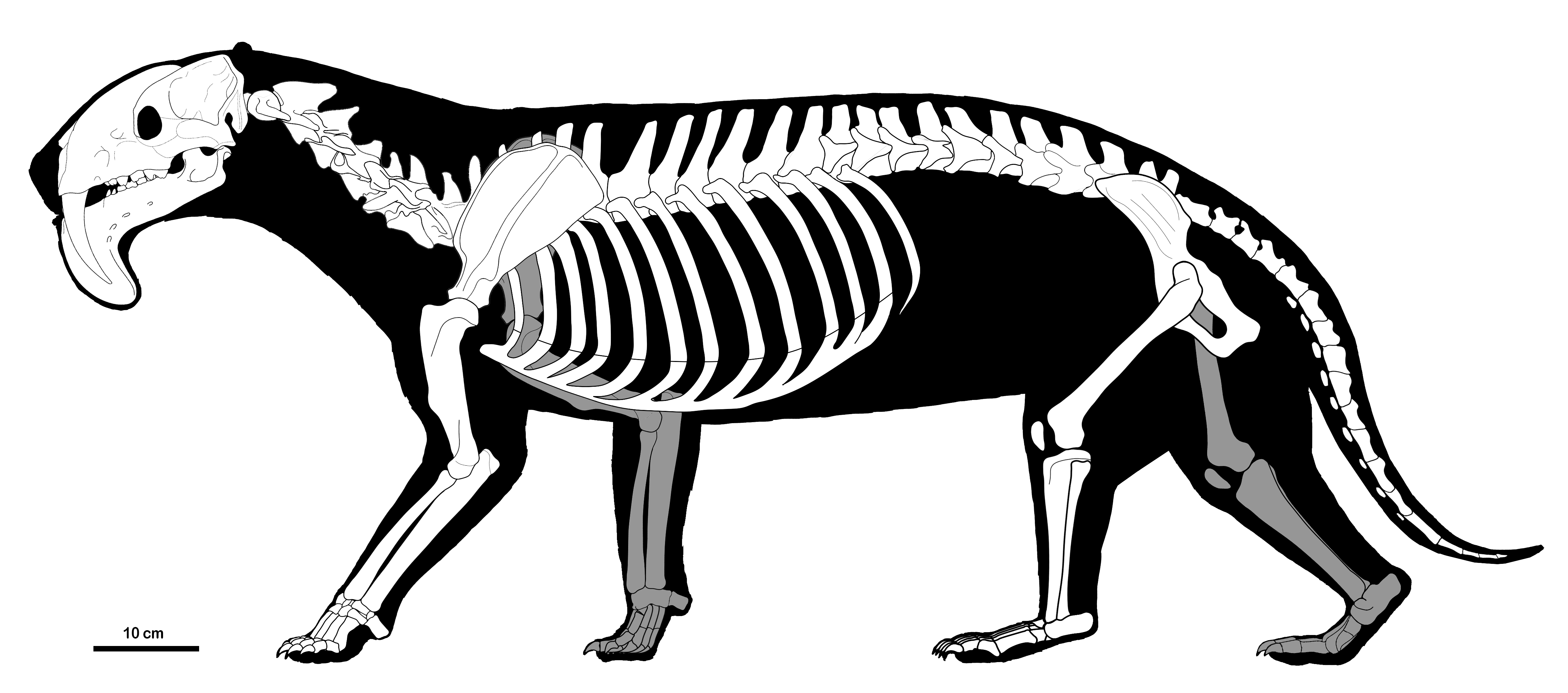
Skeletal reconstruction of Thylacosmilus, a large specialised sabre-toothed sparassodont

Sparassodonts were carnivorous, and with the exception of some basal members of all members of this group were hypercarnivorous (having diets composed of more than 70% meat). Only Hondadelphys and Stylocynus appear to have exhibited adaptations for omnivory, and even then Stylocynus may have had a more mesocarnivorous diet similar to canids than an omnivorous one. Medium-to-large caviomorph rodents and rodent-like mammals (e.g., small notoungulates) appear to have been common prey items of sparassodonts. The subadult holotype of Lycopsis longirostrus preserves remains of the dinomyid Scleromys colombianus as fossilized gut contents. Sparassodont coprolites from the Santa Cruz Formation preserve the bones of chinchillid and octodontoid rodents inside them. Bite marks from medium-sized sparassodonts have been found on the small notoungulate Paedotherium. Stable isotope data from the early late Miocene Lycopsis viverensis and Thylacosmilus atrox suggests that these species fed on C3 grazers in open habitats, likely notoungulates.

Bite marks likely pertaining to hathliacynid sparassodonts have been found on the remains of penguins and flightless marine ducks in ancient seabird nesting colonies, suggesting that sparassodonts raided seabird colonies for eggs, carrion, and other prey like many predatory mammals do today.

Borhyaenid and proborhyaenid sparassodonts have been interpreted as being capable of crushing bones similar to modern hyenas, wolverines, or the Tasmanian devil (Sarcophilus harrisii) based on their deep jaws, bulbous premolars with deep roots and pronounced wear at their tips, extensive fused or interlocking mandibular symphyses, large masseteric fossae, microfractures in their tooth enamel, and high estimated bite forces. Australohyaena antiquua shows particularly pronounced adaptations for bone-cracking, with a very deep jaw and strongly arched nasals similar to what is seen in modern hyaenids.

Based on studies of the postcranial skeleton, it appears as though most sparassodonts were scansorial (adapted for climbing), although terrestrial adaptations evolved in Lycopsis longirostrus, borhyaenids, proborhyaenids, and thylacosmilids. Most sparassodonts were plantigrade, Borhyaena has been suggested to have been digitigrade but this has been questioned. The one exception was Thylacosmilus, which has been interpreted as having a digitigrade forefoot and a semiplantigrade hindfoot, this has been supported by fossil tracks.

One unusual aspect of sparassodont paleoecology is that at most fossil localities their remains are nearly ten times rarer than would be expected based on comparisons with carnivorous mammals at fossil sites in other parts of the world. The exact reasons for this are not clear, though this appears to be a broader pattern applicable to other groups of Cenozoic South American terrestrial carnivores (i.e., terror birds).

=== Sociality ===
Little is known of the behavior and biology of sparassodonts outside of general locomotor and dietary habits. Argot (2004) proposed that Thylacosmilus atrox may have exhibited protracted parental care after weaning of the offspring, given that saber teeth in general have been suggested to require long juvenile periods for the young to gain the skill necessary to use them effectively. However, this has not been tested further. Sparassodonts have relatively large and complex brains for metatherians, comparable to those of some Australian marsupials like Australian possums, though the body masses used to produce these estimates of relative brain size are low compared later studies suggesting these values could be overestimated. A 2025 endocast analysis reveals that some morphological characters found in extant marsupials were present in stem marsupials such as sparassodonts. It also reveals that hathliacynids had similar EQ to the extant didelphids, on the other hand, large borhyaenoids had small brain cases for their size.

Wounds have been documented on the face of specimens of Borhyaena tuberata and Sipalocyon gracilis, potentially suggesting aggressive habits similar to the modern Tasmanian devil (Sarcophilus harrisii).

=== Senses ===
Sparassodonts appear to have had very little binocular vision, with borhyaenids having the greatest degree of depth perception (but still lower than modern carnivorans) and the eyes of Thylacosmilus facing almost completely to the sides. However, later studies have found that Thylacosmilus likely held its head in a downward-facing position, which would have allowed for more binocular vision than previously thought.

=== Pathology ===
Several specimens of hathliacynids (Sipalocyon and Cladosictis) show a pathological disorder characterized by the presence of growths on the surface of the mandible, which in the most extreme cases can result in the loss of several teeth due to bony pathological growths. The exact cause of this condition (i.e., infection, virus, parasite) and why it seems to only occur in small sparassodonts is unknown, though this condition has also been documented in microbiotherians.

=== Extinction ===
After the Middle Miocene, sparassodonts began to slowly decline in diversity. Basal borhyaenoids are last known from the early late Miocene (Pseudolycopsis cabrerai and Lycopsis viverensis), and after this time were at least partially replaced by large-bodied basal sparassodonts such as Stylocynus. Some have proposed that this shift in dominance was because of the more omnivorous habits of basal sparassodonts, which may have been more adapted to the more seasonal South American climates of the late Neogene. Borhyaenids are last known from the latest Miocene, though only fragmentary remains of this group are known from this period. Later remains assigned to this group have since been reidentified as thylacosmilids or procyonids. By the Pliocene, only two families of sparassodonts remained in South America, the Hathliacynidae and the Thylacosmilidae. Pliocene hathliacynid remains are rare, and it is possible that these animals may have competed with the large carnivorous didelphids such as Lutreolina that appeared around this time. Hathliacynids are last definitively known from the early Pliocene, though their remains are rare.

The thylacosmilids, on the other hand, were more successful and abundant, being some of the only large mammalian carnivores in South America during the Pliocene, before dying out at the beginning of the Pleistocene epich (the youngest specimens of thylacosmilids date to around 2 Ma). It is still not certain why Sparassodonta declined in diversity and became extinct during the late Cenozoic as it has traditionally been assumed that competition from eutherian carnivorans was not a factor, as the placental analogues of sparassodonts (dogs, weasels, and saber-toothed cats) did not enter South America until the early Pleistocene, several million years after their sparassodont counterparts were assumed to have gone extinct. Pampaluctor, a large thylacosmilid from the Vorohué Formation of Argentina, which represents the youngest named sparassodont. As this formation is dated to the Plio-Pleistocene border, Pampaluctor may have coexisted with procyonids like Chapalmalania, as well as canids and mustelids. Otherwise, sparassodonts did coexist with Cyonasua-group procyonids during the late Miocene and Pliocene, but Cyonasua-group procyonids appear to have been primarily omnivorous and filled ecological niches that sparassodonts never occupied, which may be one reason that these animals were able to colonize South America despite the diverse predator guild in the late Miocene. The overall decline in sparassodont diversity from the Late Miocene to the end of the Pliocene may be linked to the climatic cooling that characterised the Late Neogene and the onset of the Quaternary glaciation. Additionally, the increased aridity of South America caused by the uplift of the Andes was likely responsible as well.
