= Khasia cordillerensis =

Khasia cordillerensis Temporal range: Early Paleocene

Scientific classification
- Kingdom: Animalia
- Phylum: Chordata
- Class: Mammalia
- Infraclass: Marsupialia
- Order: Microbiotheria
- Family: Microbiotheriidae
- Genus: †Khasia; Marshall and de Muizon, 1988
- Species: †K. cordillerensis

Binomial name
- †Khasia cordillerensis Marshall and de Muizon, 1988

Extinct genus of marsupial

Khasia ("from Antin Khasa") is a fossil genus of marsupial in the family Microbiotheriidae. It contains one known species, Khasia cordillerensis, which is known from teeth found in the Santa Lucia Formation of Mizque, Bolivia, where it lived alongside the sparassodonts Allqokirus, Mayulestes and Pucadelphys.
