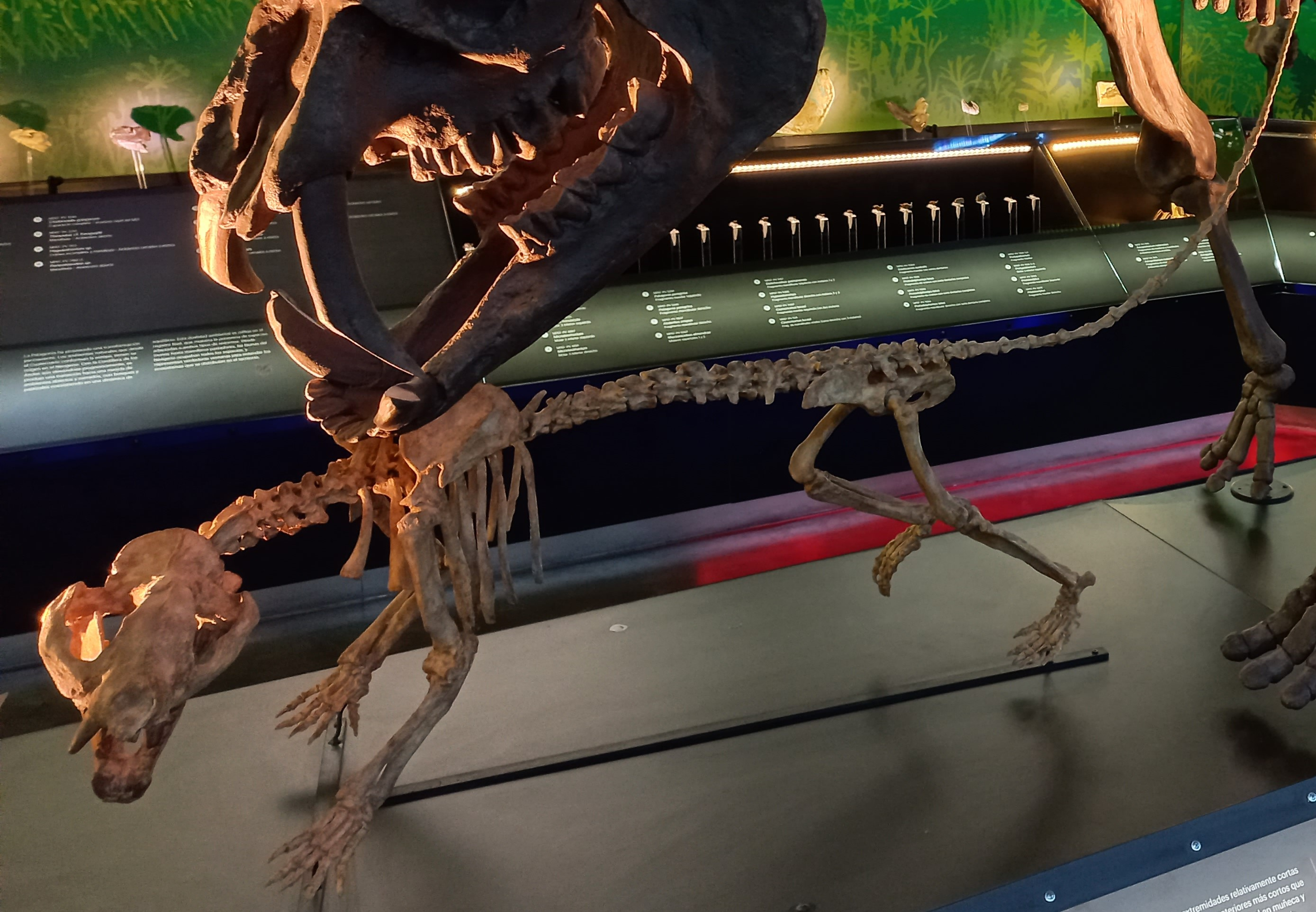
- Skeletal mount in Museo Paleontológico Egidio Feruglio

Scientific classification
- Kingdom: Animalia
- Phylum: Chordata
- Class: Mammalia
- Order: †Sparassodonta
- Family: †Borhyaenidae
- Genus: †Arctodictis; Mercerat, 1891

Type species
- Arctodictis munizi Mercerat, 1891

Other species
- Arctodictis sinclairi Marshall, 1978

= Arctodictis =

Arctodictis Temporal range: Miocene

Extinct genus of borhyaenid sparassodonts

Arctodictis is an extinct genus of borhyaenid sparassodont that lived in South America during the Miocene epoch.

== Palaeobiology ==
Arctodictis was a relatively cursorial animal, though not to the same degree as the related Borhyaena. It was a generalist carnivore. Among mammalian carnivores of the Santa Cruz Formation, Arctodictis munizi was the largest in body mass, and it also had the largest typical prey size.
