= Angelocabrerus =

Angelocabrerus Temporal range: Bartonian

Scientific classification
- Kingdom: Animalia
- Phylum: Chordata
- Class: Mammalia
- Order: †Sparassodonta
- Family: †Borhyaenidae
- Genus: †Angelocabrerus
- Species: †A. daptes

Binomial name
- †Angelocabrerus daptes Simpson, 1970

Extinct genus of borhyaenid sparassodont

Angelocabrerus is an extinct monotypic genus of borhyaenid sparassodont that lived in South America during the Bartonian stage of the Eocene epoch.

== Etymology ==
The generic name Angelocabrerus honours the zoologist and palaeontologist Angel Cabrera for his contributions to borhyaenid palaeobiology. The specific epithet of the type species, Angelocabrerus daptes, means gnawer or eater in Greek, in reference to the carnivory and possible osteophagy that the species would have engaged in.

== Distribution ==
A. daptes is known from Bartonian aged deposits in the Sarmiento Formation of Argentina.

== Palaeobiology ==
A. daptes was a carnivore, and it may have been osteophagous as well.
