= Australohyaena =

Australohyaena Temporal range: Late Oligocene 25 Ma

Scientific classification
- Kingdom: Animalia
- Phylum: Chordata
- Class: Mammalia
- Order: †Sparassodonta
- Family: †Borhyaenidae
- Genus: †Australohyaena; Forasiepi et al, 2015
- Species: †A. antiqua

Binomial name
- †Australohyaena antiqua Ameghino, 1894

Extinct family of mammals

Australohyaena is an extinct genus of carnivorous mammal, belonging to the order Sparassodonta. It lived during the Late Oligocene, and its fossilized remains were discovered in Argentina.

== Description ==
This genus is mainly known from cranial materials, and was related to the genus Borhyaena. Its skull had a short snout, strong and large canines, a particularly deep mandible, and molars with reduced talonids and protocones. It also had a swollen cranial vault, and a well-developed temporal fossa. Australohyaena was one of the largest predators of its environment, weighing up to 70 kilograms (150 lb).

== Classification ==
This genus was until recently only known from isolated teeth, described in 1894 by Florentino Ameghino as Borhyaena antiqua. These teeth were later attributed to the genus Pharsophorus. In 2014, the discovery of a complete skull allowed its identification as a new genus, Australohyaena.

Australohyaena is a member of the order Sparassodonta, a group of South American mammals similar to marsupials, whose appearance vaguely resembled placental carnivores from the rest of the world.

== Paleobiology ==
Some characteristics of Australohyaena, such as its short muzzle, its large canines, its deep mandibles and its reduced protocone and talonid, indicates that it was an hypercarnivore; the pronounced temporal fossa and the well developed cranial vault indicates that it was able to break bones thanks to its strong teeth, perhaps in a similar behaviour than modern hyaenas.

== Bibliography ==
- F. Ameghino. 1894. Sur les oiseaux fossiles de Patagonie; et la faune mammalogique des couches à Pyrotherium. Boletin del Instituto Geographico Argentino 15:501-660
- A. M. Forasiepi, M. Judith Babot, and N. Zimicz. 2014. Australohyaena antiqua (Mammalia, Metatheria, Sparassodonta), a large predator from the Late Oligocene of Patagonia. Journal of Systematic Palaeontology 13(6):503-525
