= Tiupampan =

Geologic period

The Tiupampan (Spanish: Tiupampense) age is a period of geologic time (64.5–62.5 Ma) within the Paleocene epoch of the Paleogene used more specifically with South American land mammal ages (SALMA). It is the oldest SALMA age and precedes the Peligran age.

== Etymology ==
The age is named after the paleontological site Tiupampa in Bolivia.

== Formations ==
Locations of Tiupampan formations

Formation bold is type	Country	Basin	Notes
Santa Lucía Formation	Bolivia	Potosí Basin	
Chota Formation	Peru	Bagua Basin	
Guaduas Formation	Colombia	Altiplano Cundiboyacense	
Lefipán Formation (pre-Tiupampan)	Argentina	Cañadón Asfalto Basin	
Maria Farinha Formation	Brazil	Parnaíba Basin	
Salamanca Formation	Argentina	Golfo San Jorge Basin	

== Fossils ==
Group	Fossils	Formation	Notes
Mammals	Alcidedorbignya inopinata, Allqokirus australis, Andinodelphys cochabambensis, Andinodus boliviensis, Incadelphys antiquus, Jaskhadelphys minutus, Khasia cordillerensis, Mayulestes ferox, Mizquedelphys pilpinensis, Molinodus suarezi, Peradectes austrinum, Pucadelphys andinus, Pucanodus gagnieri, Roberthoffstetteria nationalgeographica, Simoclaenus sylvaticus, Szalinia gracilis, Tiulordia floresi, Tiuclaenus minutus, Cimolestes sp., Didelphoidea indet., Henricosborniidae or Oldfieldthomasiidae, Proteutheria indet.	Santa Lucía	
Reptiles & amphibians	Coniophis sp., Estesiella boliviensis, Kataria anisodonta, Lapparentemys vilavilensis, Podocnemis ?brasiliensis, Roxochelys cf. vilavilensis, Zulmasuchus querejazus, Aniliidae, Boidae, ?Madtsoiidae, Tropidophiidae, Gymnophiona	Santa Lucía	
Reptiles & amphibians	Guarinisuchus munizi, Hyposaurus derbianus, Inaechelys pernambucensis	Maria Farinha	
Reptiles & amphibians	Eocaiman palaeocenicus, Kawasphenodon peligrensis, Yaminuechelys maior	Salamanca	
Fishes	Andinichthys bolivianensis, Dajetella sudamericana, Enchodus oliveirai, Gasteroclupea branisai, Hoffstetterichthys pucai, Incaichthys suarezi, Lepidosiren cf. paradoxa, Phareodusichthys tavernei, Eohiodon sp., Hoplias sp., Lepisosteus sp., Miletes sp., Percichthys sp., Phareodus sp., Rhineastes sp., Rhodsia sp., Ictaluridae indet.	Santa Lucía	
Fishes	Myliobatis dixoni	Maria Farinha	
Flora	Archaeopaliurus boyacensis, Coussapoa camargoi, Ficus andrewsi, Berhamniphyllum sp.	Guaduas	
Flora	Cupressinoxylon artabeae, Notiantha, Suessenia	Salamanca	

== Correlations ==
Tiupampan correlations in South America
Formation	Santa Lucía	Guaduas	Maria Farinha	Salamanca	Lefipán	Map
Basin	Potosí	Altiplano Cundiboyacense	Parnaíba	Golfo San Jorge	Cañadón Asfalto	Tiupampan (South America)
Country	Bolivia	Colombia	Brazil	Argentina		Tiupampan (South America)
Mammals						Tiupampan (South America)
Reptiles						Tiupampan (South America)
Fish						Tiupampan (South America)
Flora						Tiupampan (South America)
Environments	Fluvio-lacustrine	Paludal	Shallow marine	Paludal-estuarine	Deltaic-shallow marine	Pre-Tiupampan flora & fauna Tiupampan fauna Tiupampan flora
Volcanic						Pre-Tiupampan flora & fauna Tiupampan fauna Tiupampan flora
