= Australogale =

Australogale Temporal range: Serravallian

Scientific classification
- Kingdom: Animalia
- Phylum: Chordata
- Class: Mammalia
- Order: †Sparassodonta
- Family: †Hathliacynidae
- Genus: †Australogale
- Species: †A. leptognathus

Binomial name
- †Australogale leptognathus Engelman et al., 2018

Extinct genus of hathliacynid sparassodonts

Australogale is an extinct genus of hathliacynid sparassodont that lived in Bolivia during the Serravallian stage of the Miocene epoch.

== Description ==
Australogale leptognathus was a very small sparassodont, weighing only about 840 g. It is distinguished by its lack of a posterobasal heel on the P_{2}, the P_{2} being much larger than the P_{3}, the lack of an entocristid on the M_{1}, an entocristid positioned lingually to the trigonid on the M_{2}, and a conically shaped entoconid.
