= Plesiofelis =

Plesiofelis Temporal range: Lutetian–Priabonian

Scientific classification
- Kingdom: Animalia
- Phylum: Chordata
- Class: Mammalia
- Order: †Sparassodonta
- Superfamily: †Borhyaenoidea
- Genus: †Plesiofelis
- Species: †P. schlosseri

Binomial name
- †Plesiofelis schlosseri Roth, 1904

Extinct genus of borhyaenoid sparassodont

Plesiofelis is an extinct monotypic genus of borhyaenoid sparassodont that lived in South America during the Eocene epoch.

== Description ==
Plesiofelis schlosseri, the type species of the genus, has been estimated to have had a body mass of approximately 40 kg.
