= Acrocyon =

Acrocyon Temporal range: Aquitanian–Burdigalian

Scientific classification
- Kingdom: Animalia
- Phylum: Chordata
- Class: Mammalia
- Order: †Sparassodonta
- Family: †Borhyaenidae
- Genus: †Acrocyon; Ameghino, 1891

Type species
- Acrocyon sectorius Ameghino, 1891

Other species
- Acrocyon riggsi Sinclair, 1930

Extinct genus of borhyaenid sparassodont

Acrocyon is an extinct genus of borhyaenid sparassodont that lived in South America during the Miocene epoch.

== Description ==
Acrocyon sectorius, the type species, has been estimated to have had a body mass of about 28.7 kg.
