= Pseudonotictis =

Pseudonotictis Temporal range: Burdigalian–Langhian

Scientific classification
- Kingdom: Animalia
- Phylum: Chordata
- Class: Mammalia
- Order: †Sparassodonta
- Family: †Hathliacynidae
- Genus: †Pseudonotictis; Marshall, 1981

Type species
- Pseudonotictis pusillus Ameighino, 1891

Other species
- Pseudonotictis chubutensis Martín and Tejedor, 2007

Extinct genus of hathliacynid sparassodont

Pseudonotictis is an extinct genus of hathliacynid sparassodont that lived in South America during the Burdigalian and Langhian stages of the Miocene epoch.

== Description ==
Pseudonotictis chubutensis differs from Pseudonotictis pusillus, the type species, in that the former is smaller than the latter. P. chubutensis also has a relatively smaller trigon on its M^{2} than does P. pusillus. In P. chubutensis, the preparacrista is only minimally developed and does not connect to the labial cingulum, unlike the strongly developed preparacrista seen in P. pusillus. Also, the height differential between the paracone and metacone is greater in P. chubutensis than P. pusillus.
