= Chlorocyon =

Chlorocyon Temporal range: Lutetian

Scientific classification
- Kingdom: Animalia
- Phylum: Chordata
- Class: Mammalia
- Order: †Sparassodonta
- Superfamily: †Borhyaenoidea
- Genus: †Chlorocyon
- Species: †C. phantasma

Binomial name
- †Chlorocyon phantasma Engelman et al., 2018

Extinct genus of borhyaenoid sparassodont

Chlorocyon is an extinct monotypic genus of borhyaenoid sparassodont that lived in Chile during the Lutetian stage of the Eocene epoch, during the Mustersan South American land mammal age.

== Etymology ==
The generic name Chlorocyon is a combination of the Greek words chloros, meaning green, and cyon, meaning dog. The specific epithet of the type species, Chlorocyon phantasma, means phantom in Greek.
