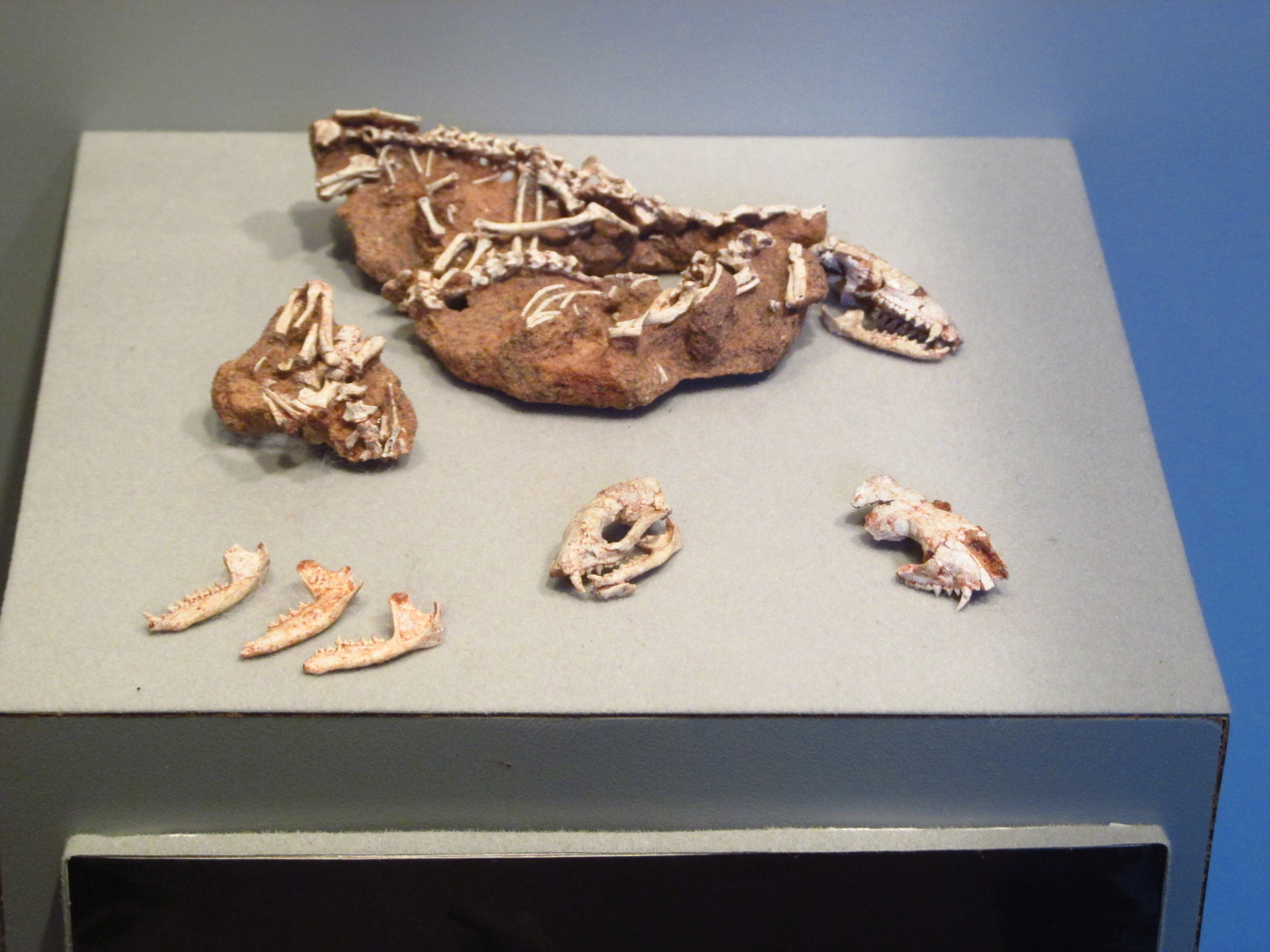
- Fossils from Bolivia

Scientific classification
- Kingdom: Animalia
- Phylum: Chordata
- Class: Mammalia
- Infraclass: Marsupialia (?)
- Genus: †Pucadelphys; Marshall & De Muizon, 1988
- Species: †P. andinus

Binomial name
- †Pucadelphys andinus Marshall & De Muizon, 1988

= Pucadelphys =

Pucadelphys Temporal range: Early Paleocene (Tiupampan) ~66–61.7 Ma

Extinct genus of mammals

Pucadelphys is an extinct genus of non-marsupial metatherian (or possibly crown group Marsupial.). The genus is monotypic and contains the single species P. andinus. Fossils of Pucadelphys have been found in the Santa Lucía Formation in Tiupampa in Bolivia.

== Description ==
Pucadelphys had a thin osseous wall separating the fossa subarcuata and the internal acoustic meatus. Pucadelphys also generally had a short sulcus for the sigmoid sinus located posteriorly to the dorsal edge of the fossa subarcuata, although at least one preserved Pucadelphys petrosal lacks this trait. The sulcus for the superior sinus was very distinct and pronounced in Pucadelphys.

Pucadelphys was small and likely to have eaten insects. It had a long tail, although incomplete on the best preserved fossils. It is possible that the tail was longer than (or at least as long as) its body. 17 vertebrae were preserved, and its estimated that there was 5 to 10 additional vertebrae originally. It is regarded as partially arboreal, and partially terrestrial. It may have been social, as more than 30 specimens have been found together.

== Taxonomy ==
A 2016 phylogenetic analysis recovered Pucadelphys as a member of a metatherian clade including sparassodonts and other South American taxa, but not marsupials (which are instead closer to Cretaceous North American species). The phylogenetic tree from the analysis is shown below.

- Marsupialiformes
  - - Gurlin Tsav skull
    - - Borhyaenidae
      - - Mayulestes
        - - Jaskhadelphys
          - - Andinodelphys
            - Pucadelphys
  - - Asiatherium
    - - - Iugomortiferum
        - Kokopellia
      - Aenigmadelphys
      - Anchistodelphys
      - - Glasbiidae
          Glasbius
        - Pediomyidae
          Pediomys
      - Stagodontidae
        - Pariadens
        - - Eodelphis
          - Didelphodon
      - Alphadontidae
        - Turgidodon
        - Alphadon
        - Albertatherium
      - Marsupialia

In 2022, a study, which provided strong evidence that Deltatheridium is the earliest known crown group Marsupial, also provided support for it and Pucadelphys to be positioned as a sister taxa to modern American opossums. This would make Pucadelphys a crown group marsupial.
