= Perathereutes =

Perathereutes Temporal range: Burdigalian

Scientific classification
- Kingdom: Animalia
- Phylum: Chordata
- Class: Mammalia
- Order: †Sparassodonta
- Genus: †Perathereutes; Ameghino, 1891

Type species
- Perathereutes pungens Ameghino, 1891

Other species
- Perathereutes amputans Ameghino, 1891; Perathereutes obtusus Ameghino, 1891

Extinct genus of sparassodont

Perathereutes is an extinct genus of sparassodont that lived in Argentina during the Burdigalian stage of the Mioceneepoch, during the Santacrucian South American land mammal age.

== Palaeobiology ==
The mandibular morphology of Perathereutes occupies a morphospace overlapping with that of extant insectivores and generalist omnivores, suggesting a comparable dietary ecology.
