= Allqokirus =

Allqokirus Temporal range: Danian

Scientific classification
- Kingdom: Animalia
- Phylum: Chordata
- Class: Mammalia
- Order: †Sparassodonta
- Family: †Mayulestidae
- Genus: †Allqokirus
- Species: †A. australis

Binomial name
- †Allqokirus australis Muizon and Marshall, 1988

Extinct genus of mayulestid sparassodont

Allqokirus is an extinct monotypic genus of mayulestid sparassodont that lived in South America during the Danian stage of the Palaeocene epoch, during the Tiupampan South American land mammal age.

== Palaeobiology ==
Allqokirus australis was a carnivore, and together with Mayulestes formed the predator guild of the Santa Lucia Formation fauna.
