= Anachlysictis =

Anachlysictis Temporal range: Mid Miocene (Laventan) ~13.8–11.8 Ma
- The holotype lower jaw

Scientific classification
- Kingdom: Animalia
- Phylum: Chordata
- Class: Mammalia
- Order: †Sparassodonta
- Family: †Thylacosmilidae
- Genus: †Anachlysictis; Goin, 1997
- Species: †A. gracilis

Binomial name
- †Anachlysictis gracilis Goin, 1997

Extinct species of mammal

Anachlysictis gracilis is an extinct carnivorous mammal belonging to the group Sparassodonta, which were metatherians (a group including marsupials and their close relatives) that inhabited South America during the Cenozoic. Anachlysictis is the first record of such borhyaenoids in northern South America, and also the most primitive known member of the family Thylacosmilidae, a group of predators equipped with "saber teeth". It was also the only confirmed record of a thylacosmilid that did not belong to the genus Thylacosmilus until the official publication of Patagosmilus in 2010.

This species was found in the Villavieja Formation in the area of La Venta in Colombia, a fossil deposit in the Middle Miocene (Laventan; 13.8–11.8 million years ago), based on fragments that include a front portion of the lower jaw, with an incipient molar tooth and a piece of carnassial from the front of the maxilla.

The most complete fossil of Anachlysictis is VPPLT-1612, a nearly complete skull and skeleton stored at Museo de Historia Natural de La Tatacoa (the La Tatacoa Natural History Museum) in Victoria, Colombia. The skull of this specimen was described in 2023.

== Description ==
Anachlysictis, was smaller than its better-known relative Thylacosmilus. It weighed around 18–22 kilograms (40–49 lb), around the size of a large lynx. The specialized features of Thylacosmilus, such as the flanges on the lower jaw, were smaller (due to the upper canines not being proportionately as long). It also lacked a rim around the eye socket, resulting in a more flattened shape of the skull. Otherwise the anatomy of Anachlysictis was not as specialized as its later relatives. It had carnassial teeth to effectively process meat, and flat fangs, located just below the nose, that were not cross-rounded as in unspecialized mammal carnivores. The accommodation area of the masseter muscle (involved in the movements of the jaw) was reduced. This is because, as in other predatory saber-toothed species, this muscle is reduced, leaving more space for the jaw joint to increase its opening angle and letting the well-developed neck muscles bring down the skull and allow the fangs to bite into the flesh of their prey.

== Taxonomy ==
Until the discovery of Anachlysictis, it was supposed that Thylacosmilus was a close relative of the family Borhyaenidae, or even a specialized member of the same, having emerged in the Late Miocene. The primitive characteristics and age of Anachlysictis suggest an earlier origin of the thylacosmilids at the base of the superfamily Borhyaenoidea, whose monophyly needs review. The pattern of the molars of Anachlysictis is very similar to that of the little-known methatherian Hondadelphys, also from the Honda Group at the Konzentrat-Lagerstätte La Venta. This was originally considered to be a species of opossum, but is now considered a primitive sparassodont, so Hondadelphys could well represent the sister clade of Thylacosmilidae.
