= Paraborhyaena =

Paraborhyaena Temporal range: Oligocene 27–26 Ma

Scientific classification
- Domain: Eukaryota
- Kingdom: Animalia
- Phylum: Chordata
- Class: Mammalia
- Order: †Sparassodonta
- Family: †Proborhyaenidae
- Genus: †Paraborhyaena; Hoffstetter & Petter, 1983
- Species: †P. boliviana

Binomial name
- †Paraborhyaena boliviana Hoffstetter & Petter, 1983

Extinct genus of metatherians

Paraborhyaena is an extinct genus of Sparassodont, belonging to the family Proborhyaenidae. It was one of the large terrestrial predators that roamed South America during the Oligocene.

== Discovery ==
Fossil remains of Paraborhyaena have been discovered in the Salla Formation in Bolivia. Those fossils date back from 27 to 26 millions of years ago, during the Deseadan stage of the Oligocene.

== Description ==
Paraborhyaena was one of the largest predatory metatherians of all times. It was the size of an American black bear, with a head-torso length of almost 1.5 meters and an estimated weight between 100 and 125 kilograms. Its skull was 40 centimeters long. Paraborhyaena had a robust head with a short snout. Unlike Borhyaena, the large canines of Paraborhyaena kept growing during its life. Its molars were well-suited for tearing flesh. It was a ground-dwelling carnivore, who preyed on medium-sized mammals, such as typotheres.
