= Acyon =

Acyon Temporal range: Miocene

Scientific classification
- Kingdom: Animalia
- Phylum: Chordata
- Class: Mammalia
- Order: †Sparassodonta
- Family: †Hathliacynidae
- Genus: †Acyon; Ameghino, 1887

Type species
- Acyon tricuspidatus Ameghino, 1897

Other species
- Acyon herrerae Marshall, 1981; Acyon myctoderos Forasiepi et al., 2006

Extinct genus of hathliacynid sparassodonts

Acyon is an extinct genus of hathliacynid sparassodonts that lived in South America during the Miocene epoch.

== Description ==
Acyon myctoderos is distinguished from Acyon herrerae by virtue of the former possessing less sectorial premolars than the latter and the former having a distinctive posterior cusp on the P_{2} that the latter species lacks. A. myctoderos differs from both A. herrerae and Acyon tricuspidatus in that A. myctoderos has more vertically oriented hypoconulids and larger hypoconids on M_{1-3}.
