= Patene =

Patene Temporal range: Eocene–Oligocene

Scientific classification
- Kingdom: Animalia
- Phylum: Chordata
- Class: Mammalia
- Order: †Sparassodonta
- Genus: †Patene; Simpson, 1935

Type species
- Patene coluapiensis Simpson, 1935

Other species
- Patene campbelli Goin and Campbell, 2004; Patene coloradensis Rangel et al., 2019; Patene simpsoni Paula Couto, 1952

Extinct genus of sparassodont

Patene is an extinct genus of sparassodont that lived in South America during the Eocene and Oligocene epochs.

== Distribution ==
Fossils of Patene are known from Peru, Brazil, and Argentina.
