= Mayulestes =

Mayulestes Temporal range: Early Paleocene (Tiupampan), 64.5 Ma

Scientific classification
- Kingdom: Animalia
- Phylum: Chordata
- Class: Mammalia
- Order: †Sparassodonta
- Family: †Mayulestidae
- Genus: †Mayulestes de Muizon 1994
- Species: †M. ferox

Binomial name
- †Mayulestes ferox de Muizon 1994

Extinct marsupial-like mammal

Mayulestes (Quechua: mayu river, + Greek: lestes, thief) is an extinct genus of carnivorous metatherian that lived in what is now Tiupampa, Bolivia in the Early Palaeocene. It shared its habitat with fellow sparassodont Pucadelphys, and a microbiotherid marsupial, Khasia.

== Palaeobiology ==
Mayulestes ferox was much more adapted for arboreal locomotion than its fellow metatherians of the Tiupampa fauna, Pucadelphys and Andinodelphys. This was likely an adaptation for avoiding terrestrial predators such as sebecosuchian crocodylomorphs.
