= Vorohué Formation =

Geologic formation in Argentina

- Stratigraphic range: Early Pleistocene
- Type: Geological formation

Location
- Country: Argentina
- Extent: Paraná Basin

The Vorohué Formation is an Early Pleistocene geological formation in Argentina. It has yielded a varied assemblage of fossil mammals, including marsupials, xenarthrans, carnivorans, meridiungulates, perissodactylans, artiodactylans, and rodents. Fossils reported from the formation include Megatherium, Glossotherium, Glyptodon, Toxodon, Mesotherium, Hippidion, Platygonus, and several genera of peccaries and camelids. The formation has also yielded Pampaluctor calibar, a thylacosmilid, from a coastal cliff north of Miramar.

== Fossil content ==
The following fossils have been reported from the formation:

=== Didelphimorphia ===
Genus	Species	Family	Locality	Material	Notes	Images
Didelphis	D. sp	Didelphidae	Arroyo Loberia			
Sparassocynus	S. derivatus	Didelphidae	Barranca Parodi			

=== Polydolopimorphia ===
Genus	Species	Family	Locality	Material	Notes	Images
Microtragulus	M. sp	Argyrolagidae	Arroyo Loberia			

=== Sparassodonta ===
Genus	Species	Family	Locality	Material	Notes	Images
Pampaluctor	P. calibar	Thylacosmilidae	A coastal cliff in north Miramar			

=== Xenarthra ===
Genus	Species	Family	Locality	Material	Notes	Images
Megatherium	M. sp.	Megatheriidae	Arroyo Loberia Barranca Parodi			
Glossotherium	G. sp.	Mylodontidae	Barranca Parodi			
Glyptodon	G. reticulatus	Glyptodontidae	Arroyo Loberia			

=== Carnivora ===
Genus	Species	Family	Locality	Material	Notes	Images
Galictis	G. sorgentini	Mustelidae	Arroyo Loberia			
Protocyon	P. scagliarum	Canidae	Arroyo Loberia			
Canis	C. sp.	Canidae	Arroyo Loberia			
Dusicyon	D. sp.	Canidae	Arroyo Loberia			
Chapalmalania	C. sp.	Procyonidae	Barranca Parodi			

=== Meridiungulata ===
Genus	Species	Family	Locality	Material	Notes	Images
Toxodon	T. sp.	Toxodontidae	Arroyo Loberia			
Mesotherium	M. sp.	Mesotheriidae	Arroyo Loberia			
Tremacyllus	T. sp.	Hegetotheriidae	Arroyo Loberia			
Paedotherium	P. sp.	Hegetotheriidae	Arroyo Loberia			
Windhausenia	W. sp.	Macraucheniidae	Arroyo Loberia			

=== Perissodactyla ===
Genus	Species	Family	Locality	Material	Notes	Images
Hippidion	H. chapalmalensis	Equidae	Arroyo Loberia			

=== Artiodactyla ===
Genus	Species	Family	Locality	Material	Notes	Images
Platygonus	P. chapalmalensis	Tayassuidae	Arroyo Loberia			
Catagonus	C. sp.	Tayassuidae	Arroyo Loberia			
Lama	L. sp.	Camelidae	Arroyo Loberia			
Palaeolama	P. sp.	Camelidae	Arroyo Loberia			

=== Rodentia ===
Genus	Species	Family	Locality	Material	Notes	Images
Akodon	A. lorenzinii	Cricetidae		Barranca Parodi		
