= Eomakhaira =

Scientific classification
- Kingdom: Animalia
- Phylum: Chordata
- Class: Mammalia
- Order: †Sparassodonta
- Superfamily: †Borhyaenoidea
- Genus: †Eomakhaira; Engelman et al., 2020
- Species: †E. molossus

Binomial name
- †Eomakhaira molossus Engelman et al., 2020

Extinct genus of sparassodont mammals

Eomakhaira is an extinct genus of sparassodont known from the Oligocene Abanico Formation of Chile. It contains a single species, Eomakhaira molossus. Initially described as a thylacosmilid, subsequent research has supported a position outside of this clade.
