= Stylocynus =

Stylocynus Temporal range: Miocene

Scientific classification
- Kingdom: Animalia
- Phylum: Chordata
- Class: Mammalia
- Order: †Sparassodonta
- Genus: †Stylocynus; Mercerat, 1917

Type species
- †Stylocynus paranensis

Extinct genus of sparassodont

Stylocynus is an extinct genus of metatherian, within the order Sparassodonta. Sparassodonts were an extinct order of metatherian mammals that lived from the Early Paleocene to the Early Pleistocene. Unlike most sparassodonts, which found to have been hypercarnivorous, Stylocynus was either had an omnivorous or a mesocarnivorous diet.

== Description ==
Stylocynus was a thought to have been a large sparassodont weighing 28–35 kg (62–77 lb).
