= Sipalocyon =

Sipalocyon Temporal range: Miocene

Scientific classification
- Kingdom: Animalia
- Phylum: Chordata
- Class: Mammalia
- Order: †Sparassodonta
- Family: †Hathliacynidae
- Genus: †Sipalocyon; Ameghino, 1887

Type species
- Sipalocyon gracilis Ameghino, 1887

Other species
- Sipalocyon externus Ameghino, 1902; Sipalocyon obusta Ameghino, 1891

Extinct genus of hathliacynid sparassodont

Sipalocyon is an extinct genus of hathliacynid sparassodont that lived in South America during the Miocene epoch.

== Palaeobiology ==
The postcranial anatomy of Sipalocyon gracilis, particularly its pseudo-opposable pollex that gave it manipulative ability, suggests it was a scansorial animal.
