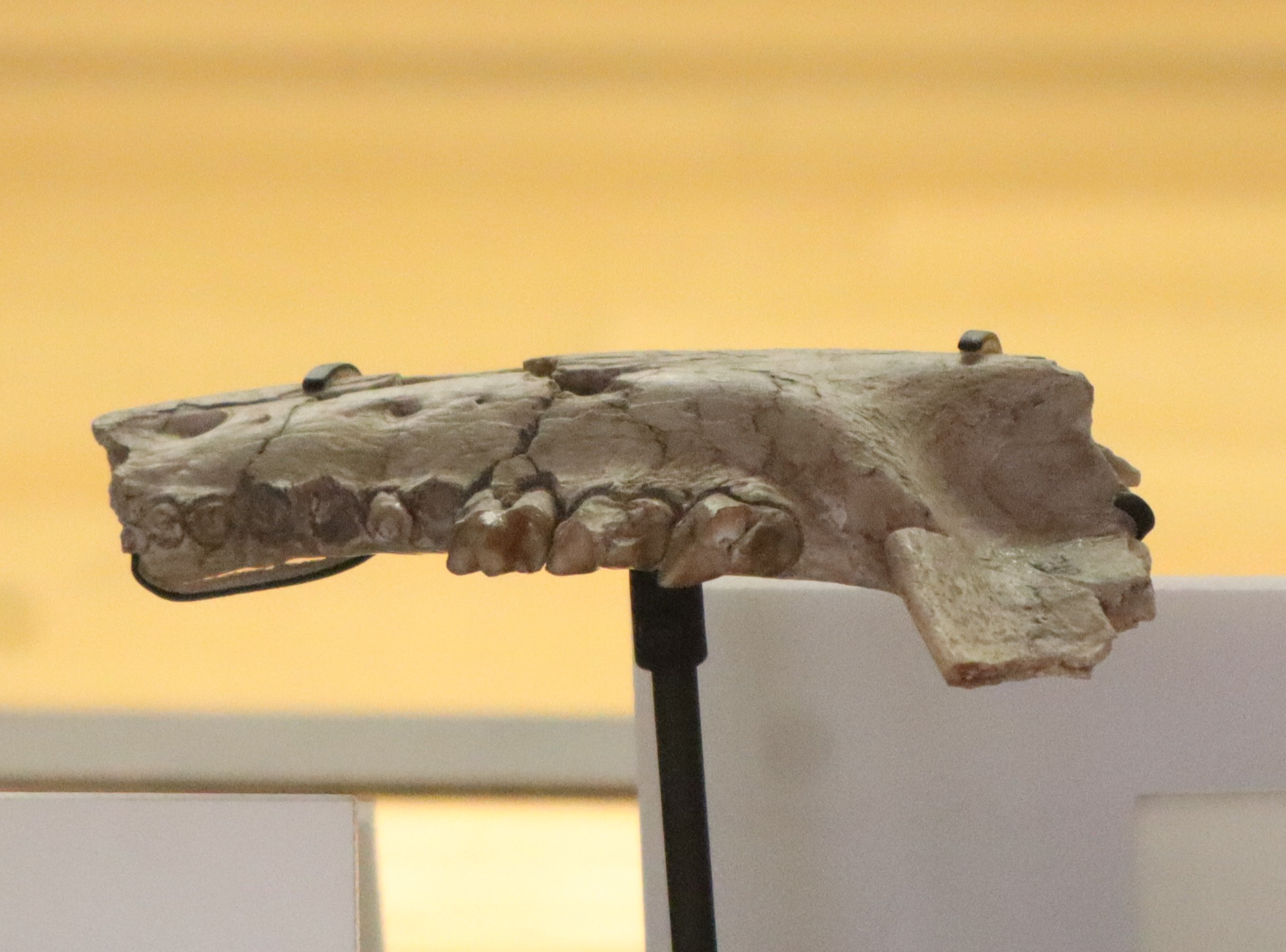
- P. tenax jaw, Beneski Museum of Natural History

Scientific classification
- Kingdom: Animalia
- Phylum: Chordata
- Class: Mammalia
- Order: †Sparassodonta
- Superfamily: †Borhyaenoidea
- Genus: †Pharsophorus; Ameghino, 1897

Species
- P. lacerans Ameghino, 1897; P. tenax Ameghino, 1897

Synonyms
- Plesiofelis Roth, 1903; Pharsophorus cretaceus Cabrera, 1927; Plesiofelis cretaceus Cabrera, 1927

= Pharsophorus =

Pharsophorus Temporal range: Mid-Late Oligocene (Deseadan) ~31.1–25.65 Ma

Extinct marsupial-like mammal

Pharsophorus is an extinct genus of borhyaenoid sparassodont that inhabited South America during the Middle to Late Oligocene epoch.

== Taxonomy ==
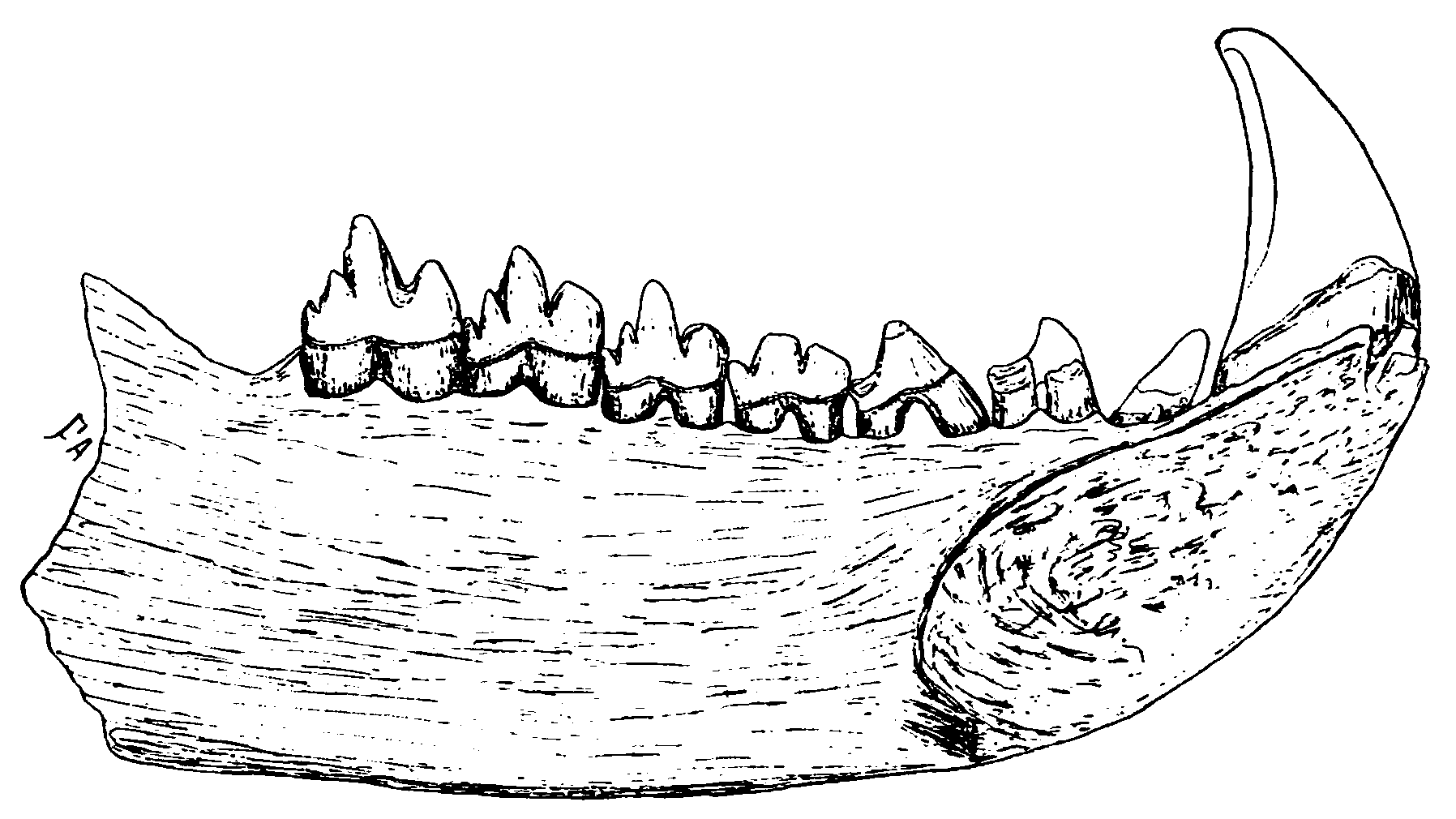
P. lacerans jaw

Originally, Pharsophorus was thought to be a borhyaenid, and was even considered to be the ancestor of Borhyaena, Acrocyon, and Arctodictis, but later phylogenetic analyses have shown that it is not a member of the Borhyaenidae and is only more distantly related to these forms. Remains of Pharsophorus are known from the Sarmiento Formation of the provinces of Mendoza, Santa Cruz, and Chubut in Argentina, as well as the Salla Formation at the fossil site of Salla in western Bolivia. The species "Pharsophorus" antiquus, formerly assigned to this genus, was eventually made the type species of a separate genus Australohyaena.

== Description ==
Pharsophorus possesses a grooved mandibular canine with a prominent medial sulcus on its lingual face but the absence of a medial sulcus on its labial face. The mandibular canine has a single root, and has a moderately thick layer of enamel.
