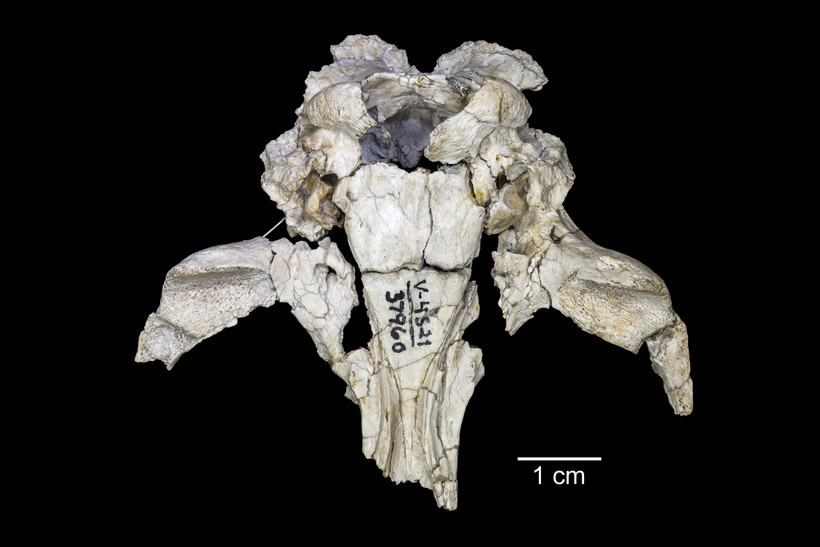
- Basicranium of Hondadelphys

Scientific classification
- Kingdom: Animalia
- Phylum: Chordata
- Class: Mammalia
- Order: †Sparassodonta
- Family: †Hondadelphidae; Marshall et al., 1990
- Genus: †Hondadelphys; Marshall, 1976

Type species
- Hondadelphys fieldsi Marshall, 1976

= Hondadelphys =

Hondadelphys Temporal range: Mid-Miocene (Laventan) ~13.8–11.8 Ma

Extinct genus of mammals

Hondadelphys is an extinct monotypic genus of carnivorous sparassodonts, known from the Middle Miocene of Colombia. The type species, H. fieldsi, was described in 1976 from the fossil locality of La Venta, which hosts fossils from the Villavieja Formation.

== Taxonomy ==
Hondadelphys was originally interpreted as belonging to the opossum family Didelphidae, but subsequently assigned to its own family, Hondadelphidae and interpreted as a basal sparassodont.

== Etymology ==
The genus name refers to the Honda Group, the stratigraphic group in which the fossils of this animal were first found, combined with delphys (Greek for "womb", a common suffix used for opossum-like metatherians).

== Palaeobiology ==
=== Diet ===
Unlike other sparassodonts, Hondadelphys occupied a morphospace close to some hypercarnivorous canids and omnivorous feliforms.
