= Andinodelphys =

Andinodelphys Temporal range: Early Paleocene (Tiupampan) ~66–61.7 Ma

Scientific classification
- Kingdom: Animalia
- Phylum: Chordata
- Class: Mammalia
- Subclass: Theria
- Clade: Metatheria
- Genus: †Andinodelphys; Marshall & Muizon, 1988
- Species: †A. cochabambensis

Binomial name
- †Andinodelphys cochabambensis Marshall & Muizon, 1988

Extinct genus of mammals

Andinodelphys is an extinct genus of non-marsupial stem metatherian.

== Details ==
Along with Pucadelphys and Mayulestes, it is the oldest known South American metatherian. It is known best from five almost complete skulls, and associated skeletons, all from Tiupampa in Bolivia. It is most similar to Pucadelphys and a clade of Pucadelphydae containing the two genera has been suggested. It was likely a gregarious animal, and a finding of six articulated and intertmingled skeletons has been used as evidence of social behavior being present in basal metatherians.
