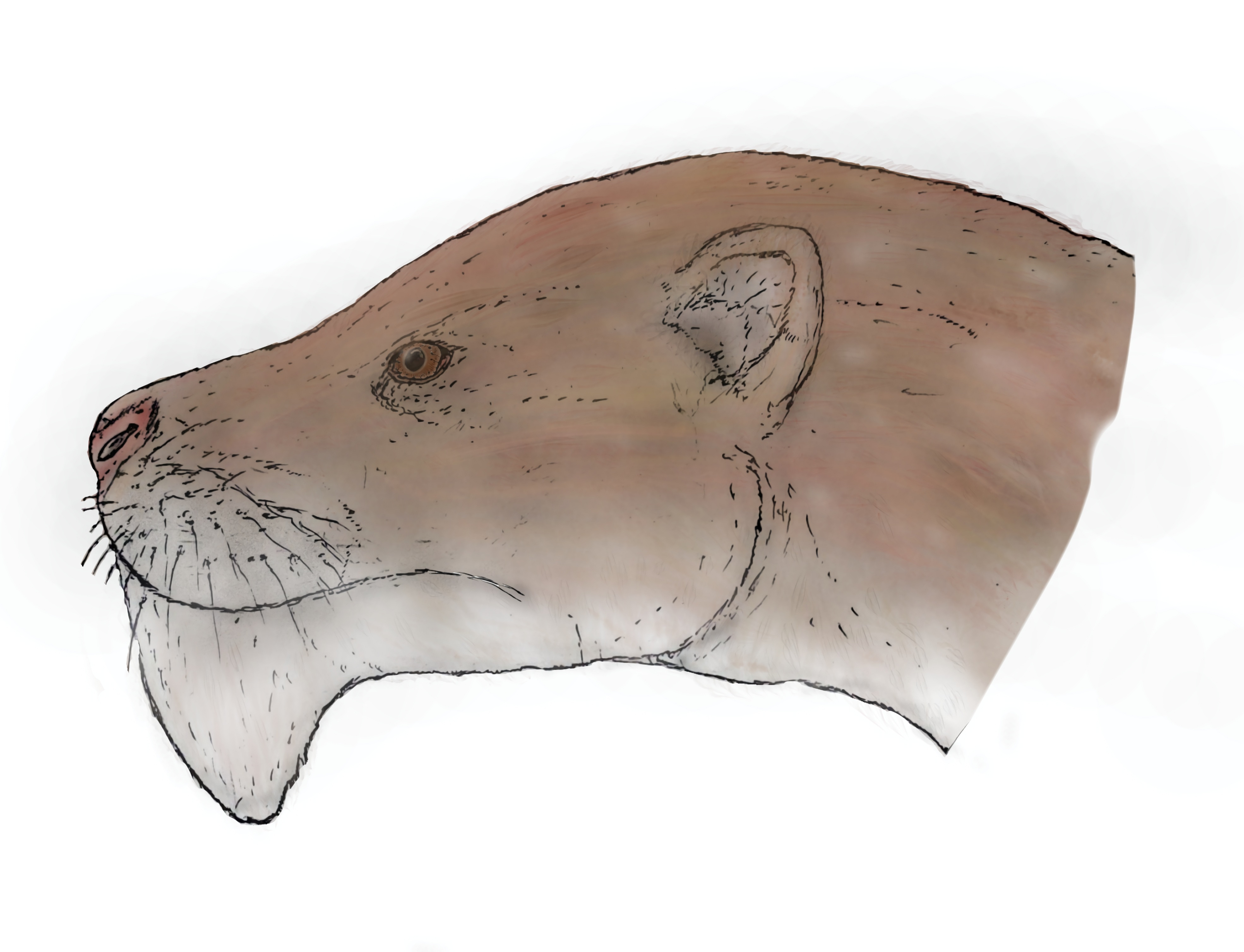

Scientific classification
- Kingdom: Animalia
- Phylum: Chordata
- Class: Mammalia
- Order: †Sparassodonta
- Family: †Thylacosmilidae
- Genus: †Patagosmilus; Forasiepi & Carlini 2010
- Species: †P. goini

Binomial name
- †Patagosmilus goini Forasiepi & Carlini 2010

= Patagosmilus =

Patagosmilus Temporal range: Mid Miocene (Colloncuran-Laventan) ~15.5–11.8 Ma

Extinct genus of mammal

Patagosmilus ("Patagonian knife" in Greek) is an extinct genus of meat-eating metatherian mammal of the family Thylacosmilidae, that lived in the Middle Miocene in South America. Like other representatives of this family, such as Thylacosmilus atrox and Anachlysictis gracilis, it was characterized by its elongated fangs of the upper jaw, similar to the well known "sabertooth cats" (Machairodontinae), of which they were ecological equivalents. Despite being geologically younger than Anachlysictis, the morphology of Patagosmilus (including a bowed molar row and extremely long, "saber-like" upper canines) suggests that this species was more closely related to Thylacosmilus than Anachlysictis, though in other respects this species is less specialized than Thylacosmilus.

== Description ==
The only known species of Patagosmilus is P. goini, named in honor of the Argentine paleontologist Francisco Goín. This species was first described and named in 2010 by Analía Forasiepi and Alfredo Carlini based on the specimen MLP 07-VII-1-1, a crushed skull and several postcranial fragments including part of an ungual phalanx that was discovered in the Collón Curá Formation dated to the Middle Miocene (Colloncuran) on the west bank of the Chico River, in Río Negro Province of Argentine Patagonia. This is the first representative of Thylacosmilidae with remains found in Patagonia, and the first genus recognised, along with Thylacosmilus and Anachlysictis that is an indisputable member of this group.
