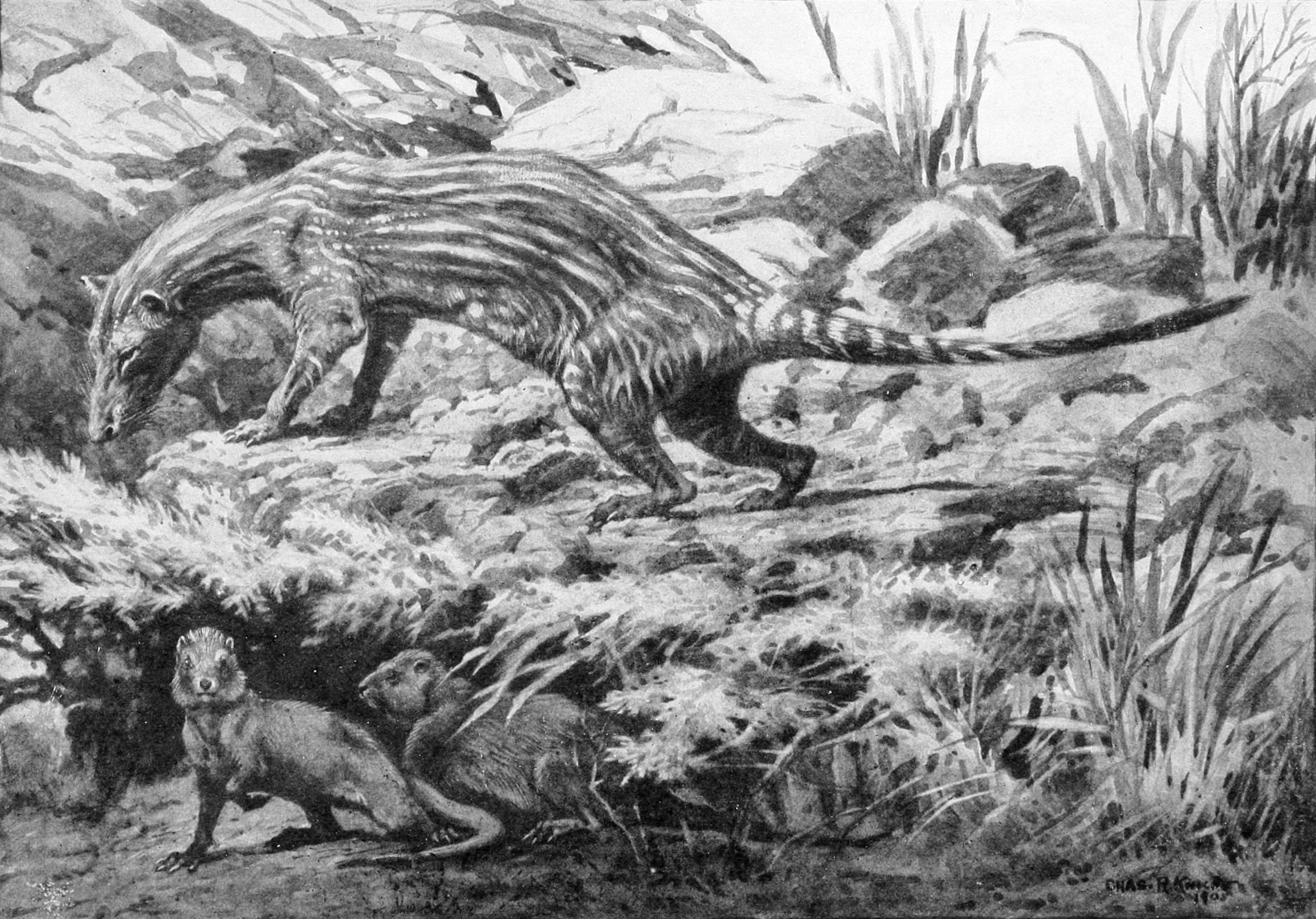
- Life restoration of P. patagonicus and Interatherium robustum

Scientific classification
- Kingdom: Animalia
- Phylum: Chordata
- Class: Mammalia
- Order: †Sparassodonta
- Family: †Prothylacinidae
- Genus: †Prothylacinus; Ameghino, 1891

Type species
- Prothylacinus patagonicus Ameghino, 1891

Synonyms
- Napodonictis Ameghino, 1894; Prothylacocyon Winge, 1923; Prothylacynus

= Prothylacynus =

Prothylacynus Temporal range: Early Miocene (Santacrucian-Friasian) ~16.0–15.5 Ma

Extinct marsupial-like mammal

Prothylacinus is an extinct monotypic genus of South American metatherian that lived during the Early Miocene.

== Description ==
Prothylacinus had a vestigial hallux that was most likely not visible in life. The humerus bore the epicondylar foramen. In form it was similar to the related Borhyaena. The genus had globose postcanine teeth. As with other sparassodonts, the deciduous teeth are less reduced, only the canines and premolars changing.

== Distribution ==
Fossils of Prothylacinus have been found in the Friasian Río Frias Formation of Chile and the Santacrucian Santa Cruz Formation of Argentina.

== Palaeobiology ==
=== Locomotion ===
The anatomy of Prothylacinus suggests it was adapted for controlled climbing.

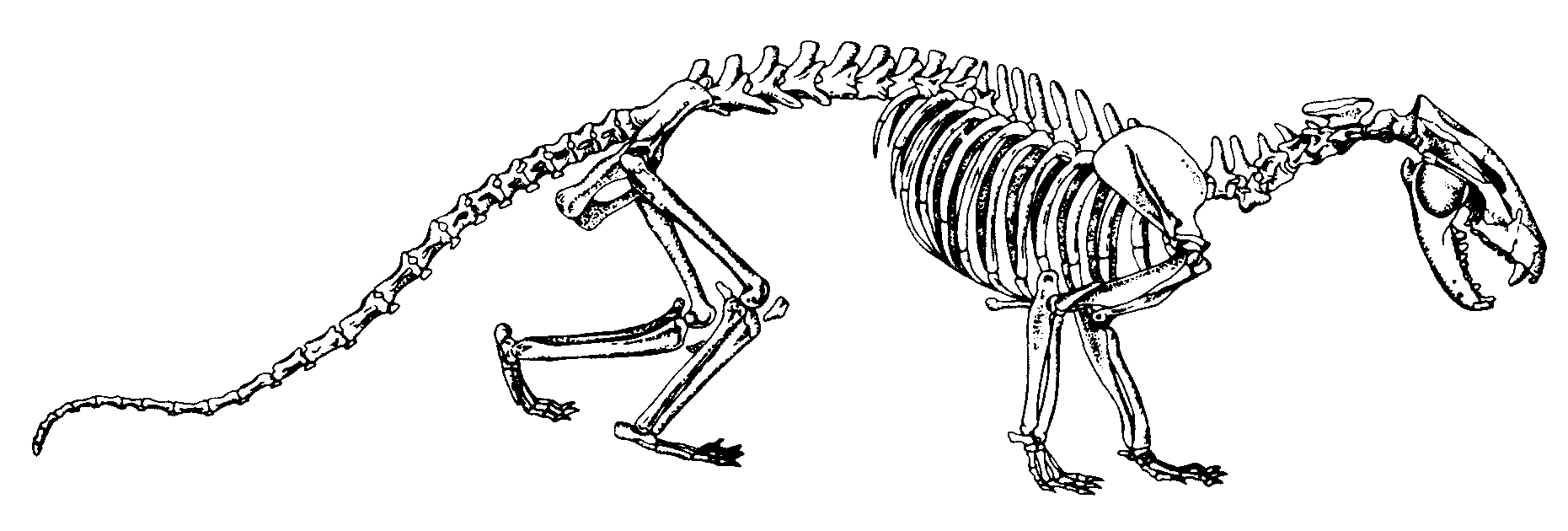
Restored skeleton
