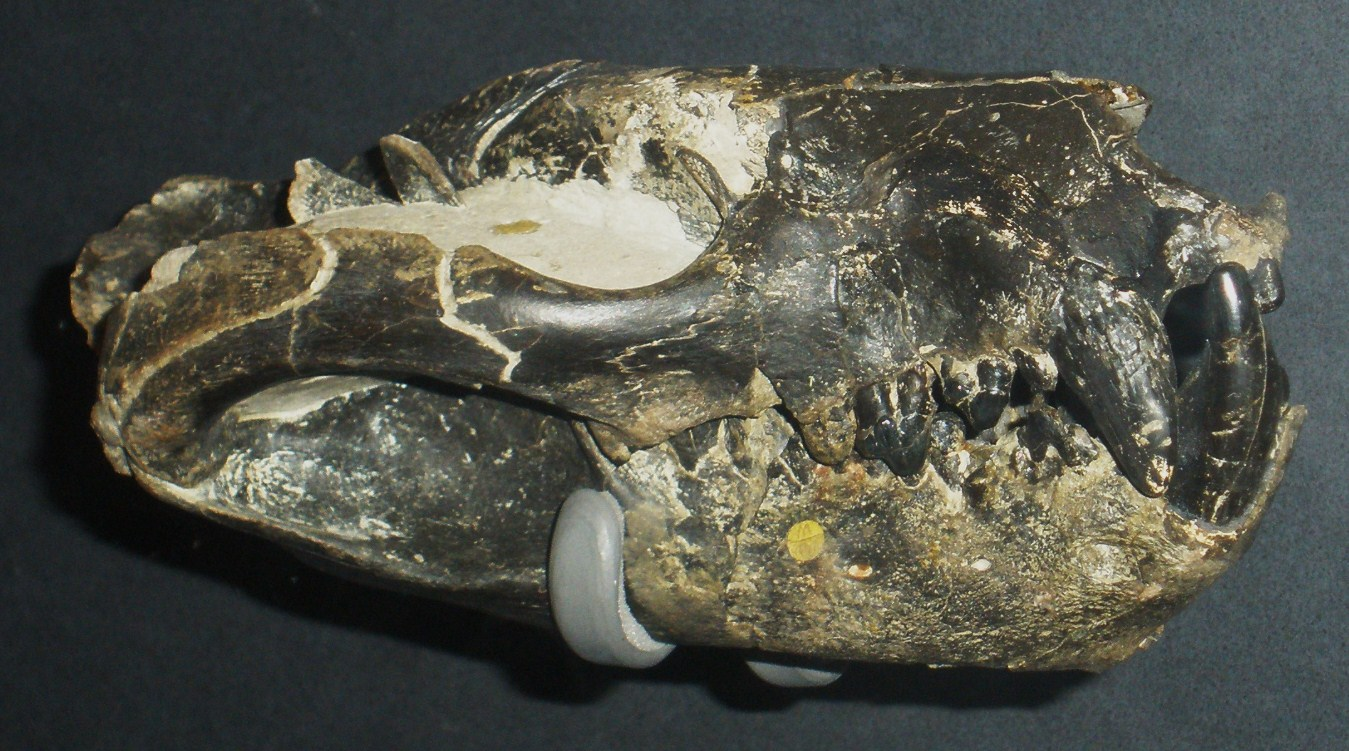
- B. tuberata skull

Scientific classification
- Kingdom: Animalia
- Phylum: Chordata
- Class: Mammalia
- Order: †Sparassodonta
- Family: †Borhyaenidae
- Genus: †Borhyaena; Ameghino 1887

Species
- B. macrodonta (Ameghino 1902); B. tuberata (Ameghino 1887)

Synonyms
- Conodonictis Ameghino 1891; Dinamictis Ameghino 1891; Pseudoborhyaena Ameghino 1902

= Borhyaena =

Borhyaena Temporal range: Early-Middle Miocene (Colhuehuapian-Friasian) ~21.0–15.5 Ma

Extinct genus of mammals

Borhyaena is an extinct genus of South American metatherian within borhyaenaid, a family of mammalian predators that was part of the now extinct order Sparassodonta. The genus lived from 21 to 15.5 million years ago from the Early to Middle Miocene.

The genus contains two species, B. macrodonta and B. tuberata. Compared to other sparassodonts, Borhyaena was found to have more adaptations towards cursoriality, however it still likely wasn’t a specialized cursorial predator as seen with wolves. It is believed that, like striped hyenas, Borhyaena searched and hunted for smaller prey without cooperation from other individuals, and other experts believed it was capable of hunting prey larger than itself.

== Classification ==
Borhyaena was a genus part of the order Sparassodonta, an extinct order of metatherian predators. It is the type genus of the family Borhyaenidae, part of the superfamily Borhyaenoidea. This superfamily includes other families such as Proborhyaenidae and Thylacosmilidae.

== Description ==
Borhyaena was a predator and had a large head and a long, powerful neck similar to living hyenas. Its legs were adapted to cursoriality, albeit less specialized than those of wolves or the thylacine. The most complete specimen is estimated to have weighted 23 kilograms (51 lb) and stood 50 centimetres (1.6 ft) at the shoulders. One study suggested that Borhyaena may have been even larger, weighing 36.42 kilograms (80.3 lb).

The footplate of the stapes of Borhyaena tuberata has a rounded morphology, and the stapedial ratio of the species, defined as the maximum length of the stapedial footplate divided by the maximal width of the footplate, was approximately 1.6.

== Paleobiology ==
=== Locomotion ===
It was believed that Borhyaena may have been digitigrade, although this has been questioned by some experts. The tail of Borhyaena is believed to have been lighter and less muscled than Prothylacinus.

While having some adaptations of cursoriality, Borhyaena wasn’t a true cursorial predator due to the generalized morphology of the autopodials, femur, and tibia, instead it may have been a long distance traveler, not a fast runner. Compared to modern day pursuit predators, its legs were shorter and heavier.

=== Diet ===
A 2010 paper estimated that B. tuberata had a bite force of 538 N or 121 lbf, with a BFQ of 165, similar that of the thylacine and American black bear. The dentition of Borhyaena suggests it wasn’t a specialist in osteophagy. One expert suggested that the foraging behavior of the animal is believed to have been comparable to the striped hyena, searching for smaller foods in denser vegetation without cooperation from individuals. However, other experts suggested Borhyaena was capable of hunting larger animals.

=== Brain anatomy and senses ===
A 2025 study found that B. tuberata had an encephalization quotient score of 0.21 to 0.24. From dorsal view, cerebrum of B. tuberata is slightly gyrencephalic and ovoid in shape. Compared to early sparassodonts, later diverging sparassodonts such as Borhyaena and Thylacosmilus had lower hearing ranges of frequency compared to other metatherians in the study.

== Paleoecology ==
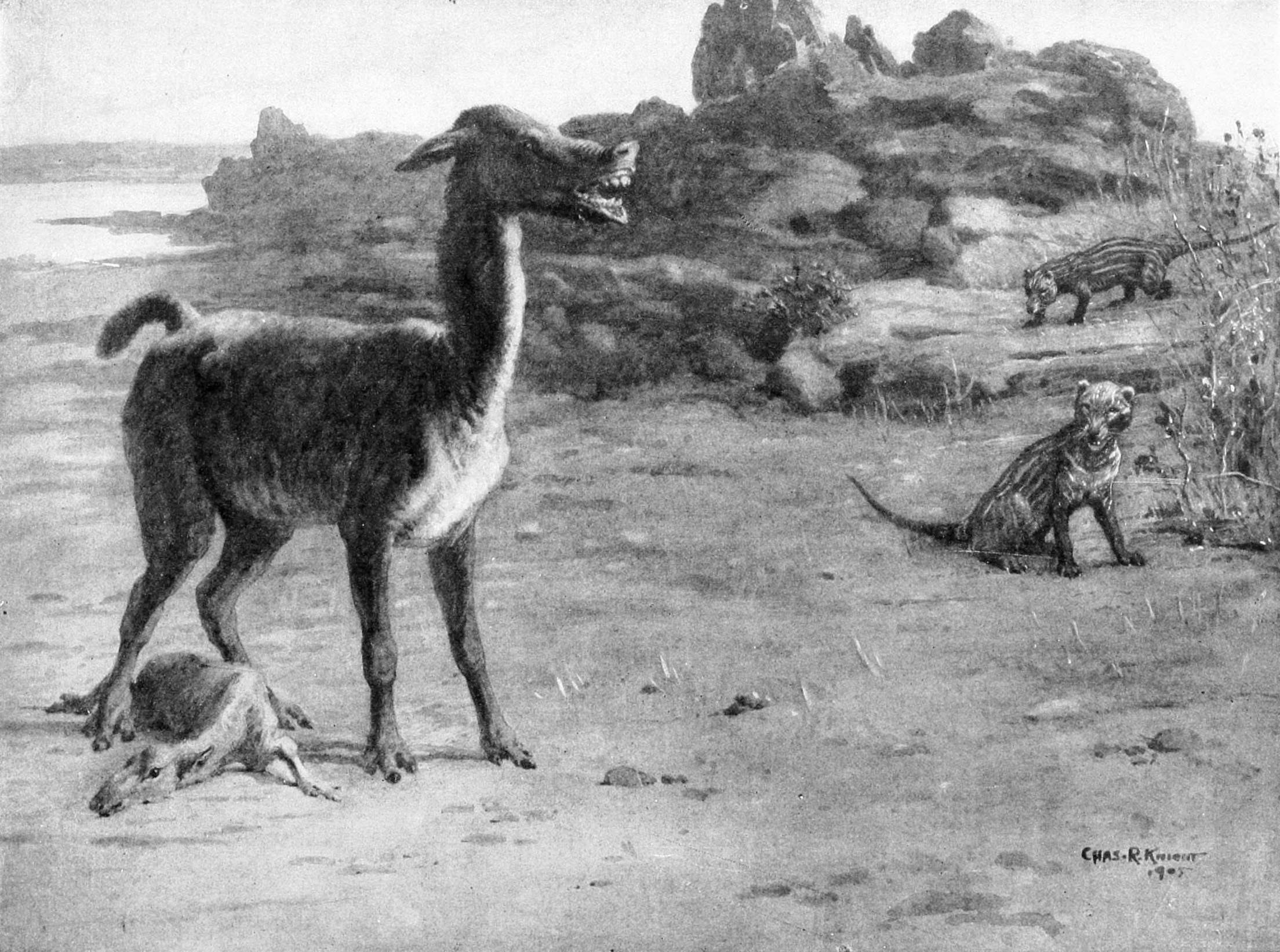
Restoration of Theosodon garretorum and Borhyaena tuberata

The genus has been found in Patagonia, Argentina (Santa Cruz and Sarmiento Formations) and Chile (Río Frias Formation). Santa Cruz Formation had a heterogeneous environment with patches forests, semi-arid forests, and open areas. Within this formation, B. tuberata coexisted with other sparassodonts. This included fellow borhyaenoids such as Acrocyon sectorius, Artodictis munizi, Lycopsis torresi, and Prothylacynus patagonicus. Hathliacynids were also present including Acyon tricuspidatus, Cladosictis patagoncia, Pseudonotictis pusillus, Perathereutes pungens, and Sipalocyon. Because of its large size, it would’ve been capable of displacing Acrocyon and Cladosictis. Borhyaena also coexisted with birds such as Brontornis, the cariamid Cariama santacrucensis, and phorusrhacids such as Patagornis marshi, Phorusrhacos, and Psilopterus bachmanni. Terror birds and sparassodonts likely occupied different niches due to locomotive differences. Herbivores present in Santa Cruz Formation included litoperns such as Diadiaphorus, Theosodon, and Tetramerorhinus, sloths such as Eucholoeops and Hapalops, and the toxodontid notoungulate Adinotherium. Borhyaena may have typically preyed on animals that weighed 17–48 kilograms (37–106 lb), such as Hapalops.
