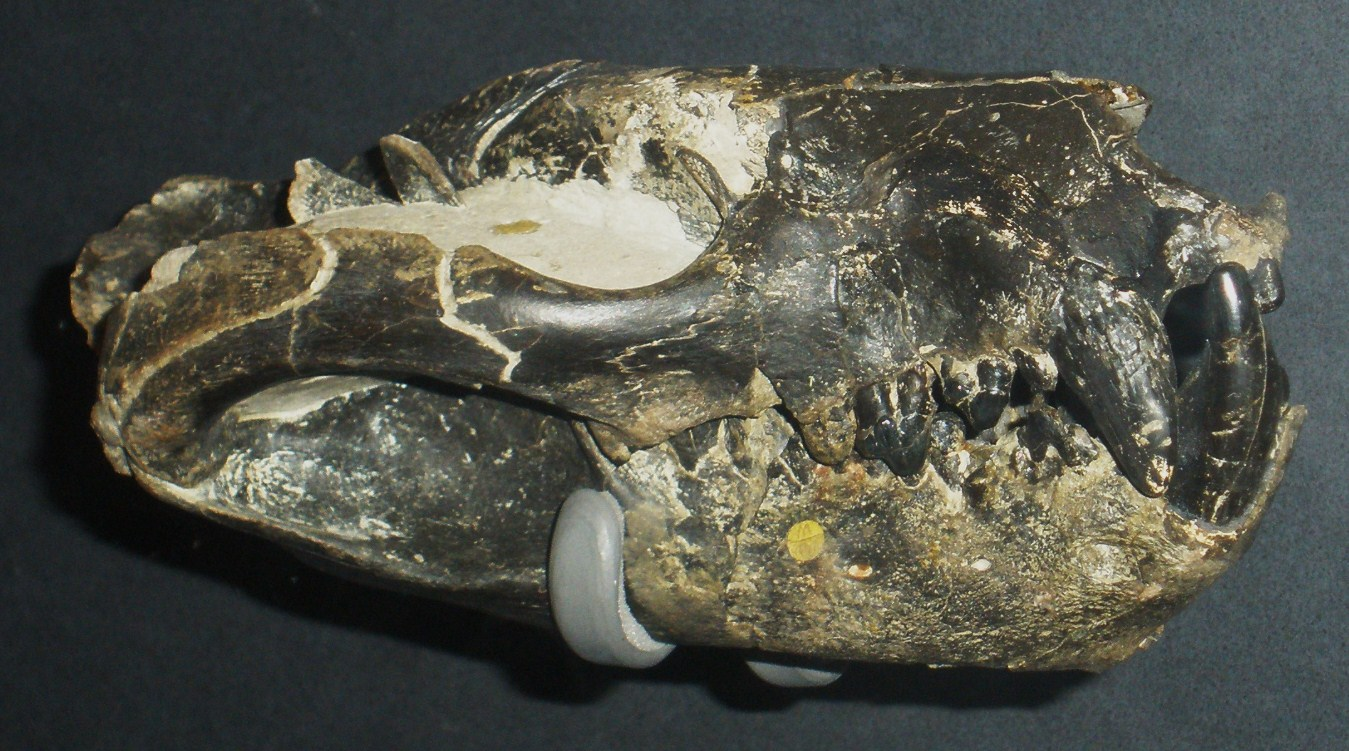
- Borhyaena tuberata skull
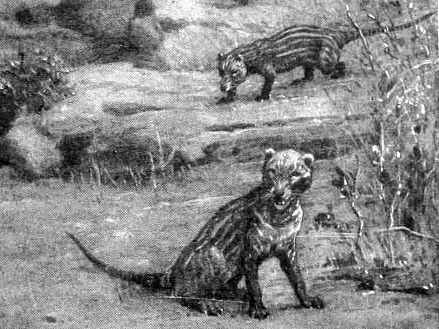
- Life restoration of Borhyaena tuberata

Scientific classification
- Kingdom: Animalia
- Phylum: Chordata
- Class: Mammalia
- Order: †Sparassodonta
- Superfamily: †Borhyaenoidea
- Family: †Borhyaenidae; Ameghino, 1894

Type genus
- Borhyaena Ameghino, 1887

= Borhyaenidae =

Borhyaenidae Temporal range: Early Oligocene–Late Miocene

Extinct family of mammals

Borhyaenidae is an extinct metatherian family of low-slung, heavily built predatory mammals in the order Sparassodonta. Borhyaenids are not true marsupials, but members of a sister taxon, Sparassodonta. Like most metatherians, borhyaenids and other sparassodonts are thought to have had a pouch to carry their offspring around. Borhyaenids had strong and powerful jaws, like those of the unrelated placentalians Hyaenodon and Andrewsarchus, for crushing bones. Borhyaenids grew up to an average of 5 to 6 feet (1.5 to 1.8 m) long.

Originally, the borhyaenids were considered one of the most diverse groups of sparassodonts, including all species not originally included in the Thylacosmilidae. However, in recent years, with the elevation of most sparassodont subfamilies to family rank and the discovery that borhyaenids are more closely related to proborhyaenids and thylacosmilids than other sparassodonts, the family has been reduced to seven species in four genera.

The most studied borhyaenids are the Early Miocene taxa, particularly from fossil sites in the southernmost part of Patagonia. One species, Australohyaena antiqua, is known from the Oligocene (Deseadan); although some Oligocene basal borhyaenoids were once considered to be borhyaenids, all other unambiguous members of the group are now considered to be restricted to the Miocene. The fossil record of this group after the Early Miocene is poor, and only fragmentary remains attest to their presence in the Late Miocene. However, the only confidently identified Late Miocene borhyaenid specimen, Stylocynus paranensis, comes from a site which is known to have Early Miocene fossils mixed in with Late Miocene ones, and so it may be that this group did not survive the end of the Early Miocene.

== Classification ==
- †Family Borhyaenidae
  - †Genus Arctodictis
    - †Arctodictis munizi
    - †Arctodictis sinclairi
  - †Genus Acrocyon
    - †Acrocyon riggsi
    - †Acrocyon sectorius
  - †Genus Australohyaena
    - †Australohyaena antiqua
  - †Genus Borhyaena
    - †Borhyaena tuberata
    - †Borhyaena macrodonta
  - †Genus ?Eutemnodus
