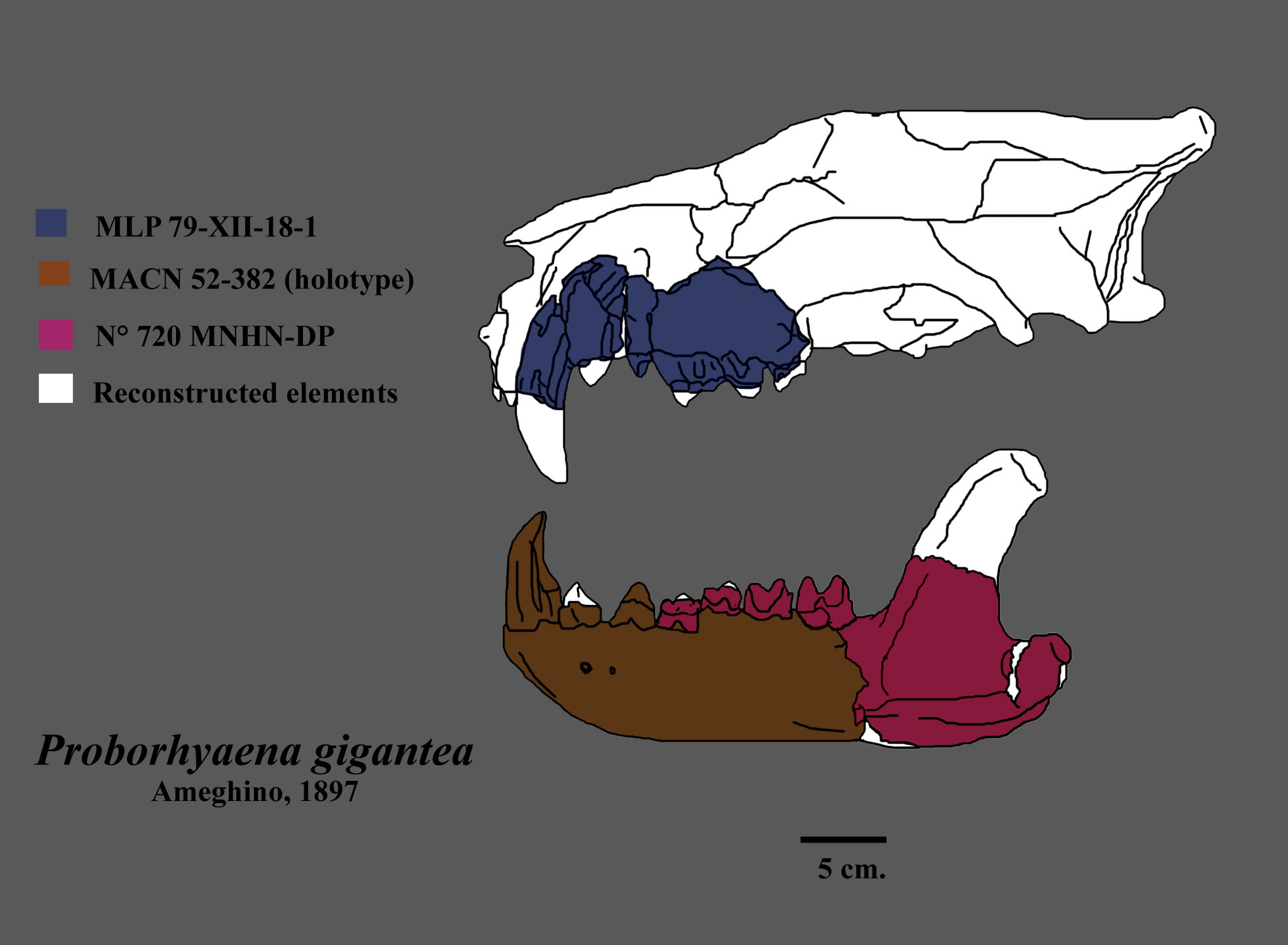
- Skull of Proborhyaena gigantea

Scientific classification
- Kingdom: Animalia
- Phylum: Chordata
- Class: Mammalia
- Order: †Sparassodonta
- Family: †Proborhyaenidae
- Genus: †Proborhyaena; Ameghino, 1897
- Species: †P. gigantea

Binomial name
- †Proborhyaena gigantea Ameghino, 1897

= Proborhyaena =

Proborhyaena Temporal range: Early-Late Oligocene (Tinguirirican-Deseadan) 33–23 Ma

Extinct genus of metatherians

Proborhyaena is an extinct genus of proborhyaenid sparassodont that lived during the Oligocene of South America. It is considered to be the largest of the sparassodonts.

== Description ==
Proborhyaena was very large in size, with the skull alone reaching up to 60 cm (2.0 ft), and the whole animal may have been as large as a present-day spectacled bear. Sorkin (2008) speculated that Proborhyaena gigantea may have weighed up to 600 kg (1,300 lb), but subsequent studies consider this an overestimate and argue that it would have weighed up to 90–200 kg (200–440 lb).

Proborhyaena was a massive animal, with a robust and powerful body. Its skull was equipped with a short, high snout, and its caniniform teeth were saber-shaped, although not as developed as those of the later Thylacosmilus. The canines, in contrast to those of Thylacosmilus, which had an "almond-shaped" section and a sharp margin, were ovoid in cross-section and thus would have been much more robust. Like the thylacosmilids, Proborhyaena possessed only one pair of lower incisors.

== Classification ==
Proborhyaena was first described by Florentino Ameghino in 1897, based on fossils found in Patagonia in deposits dating to the Late Oligocene (Deseadan). Subsequently, more fossils ascribed to this species were found from the Salla Formation of Bolivia, and the Fray Bentos Formation of Uruguay, which suggests a wide distribution and success of this sparassodont. In addition, fossils assigned to Proborhyaena have been found in the Agua de la Piedra Formation of Mendoza Province, Argentina.

Proborhyaena is the eponymous genus of the family Proborhyaenidae, also including smaller forms such as Callistoe and Arminiheringia these animals belonged to the sparassodonts, a group of metatherian mammals akin to marsupials that in South America occupied the ecological niches typical of other carnivorous mammal groups on other continents. Proborhyaena may have been the largest carnivorous metatherian that ever lived.

== Paleobiology ==
Proborhyaena is thought to have been a poor runner that probably did not chase prey over long distances for extended periods; it probably fed on large, slow-moving prey, such as Pyrotherium. Both Proborhyaena and numerous large ungulates became extinct at the end of Oligocene; it is likely that this predator-prey ratio was influenced by climate change.
