= Captain Marshall Field Expeditions =

Paleontological expeditions to South America

The Captain Marshall Field Expeditions were undertaken by the Field Museum of Natural History in Chicago, Illinois. The two Captain Marshall Field paleontological expeditions had the goal of finding South American Cenozoic mammals. The mammals of South America had evolved in near total isolation from the rest of the world from almost the beginning of the Cenozoic Era until only a few million years ago.

== 1st Captain Marshall Field Paleontological Expedition to Argentina and Bolivia ==
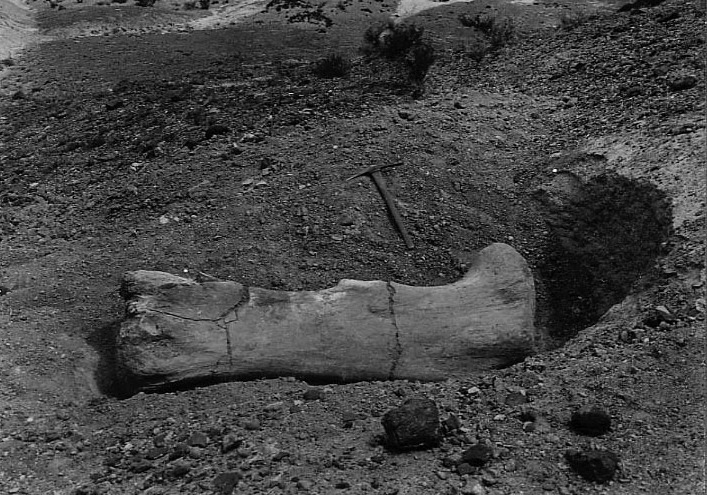
P 13352, Argyrosaurus femur found by C. Harold Riggs, son of expedition leader Elmer Riggs in the San Bernardo Hills of Argentina, February, 1924. Field Museum Photo Archives neg. CSGEO48941

The 1st Captain Marshall Field Paleontological Expedition to Argentina and Bolivia was undertaken by Elmer S. Riggs. His field crew included George F. Sternberg, John B. Abbott, Jose Strucco and C. Harold Riggs. The expedition started 1922 and finished in 1925. The objective was to find new fossil mammals from Cenozoic deposits in Chubut Province and Santa Cruz Province of Argentina and the Tarija Valley of Bolivia. The expedition succeeded in securing over 900 fossil vertebrate specimens including 12 new species with 12 holotypes, 14 paratypes and over 50 specimens since figured in scientific publications. While prospecting in the Cenozoic, brief forays into Mesozoic deposits in the San Bernardo Hills of Catamarca Province in Argentina unearthed three leg bones of enormous sauropods identified as Antarctosaurus and Argyrosaurus.

== Captain Marshall Field Expedition to China ==
In 1923, Captain Marshall Field funded Field Museum anthropologist Berthold Laufer's expedition to China. Laufer obtained an immense array of anthropological items primarily from the Sung dynasty.

== 2nd Captain Marshall Field Paleontological Expedition to Argentina and Bolivia ==
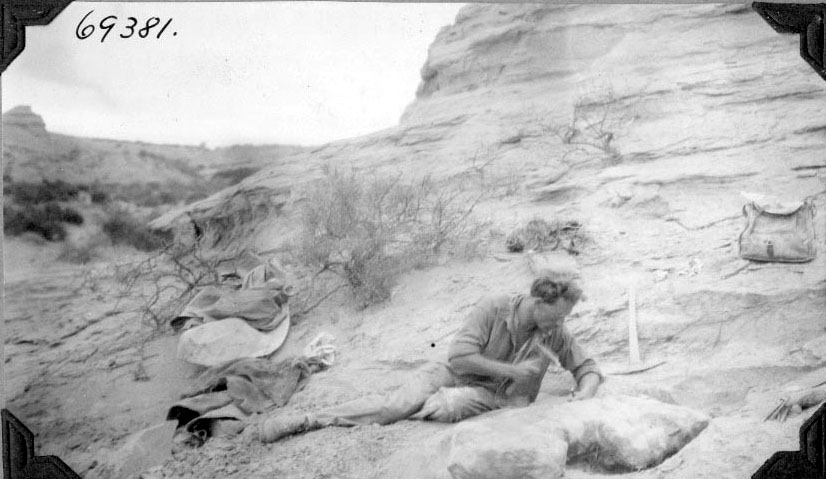
Rudolf Stahlecker collecting P 14503, Pronothrotherium skeleton from Corral Quemado in Catamarca Province, Argentina in 1926. Field Museum Photo Archives negative CSGEO69381

The 2nd Captain Marshall Field Paleontological Expedition to Argentina and Bolivia was undertaken in 1926, again under the leadership of Elmer S. Riggs. This time his field crew included Rudolf Stahlecker, Robert C. Thorne, Jose Strucco, Luis Flores, Felipe Mendez, and Colin Campbell. The expedition started in April 1926 and finished in November 1927. Riggs was again looking for Cenozoic fossil mammals and ended up working in Catamarca Province, and Buenos Aires Province, in Argentina and the Tarija Valley in Bolivia. He and his team discovered over 500 fossil vertebrates including seven new species such as the saber-toothed marsupial, Thylacosmilus atrox and flightless terror bird, Andalgalornis ferox.

== Archaeological explorations in Peru and British Honduras ==
Archaeological explorations were conducted in Peru and British Honduras in 1925. Anthropologist, A.L. Kroeber lead the expedition focused on ancient pottery from Trujillo, textiles of the early Nazca period, and an osteological study of Nasca trophy heads. He used these artifacts to attempt to determine culture periods by means of stratigraphic methods.

== Captain Marshall Field Brazilian Expedition ==
In addition to his regular annuity of $100,000, in 1927 Captain Marshall Field provided $40,000 to defray the expenses of the Brazilian Expedition under the leadership of Mr. George K. Cherrie. Mrs. Marshall Field III and Mrs. Ernest Thompson Seton were members of this expedition, and the following members of the Museum staff participated:

- Dr. B. E. Dahlgren, Acting Curator of the Department of Botany, assisted by J. R. Millar and George Petersen
- Professor Henry W. Nichols, Associate Curator of Geology
- Assistant Curator Karl P. Schmidt and Assistant Colin C. Sanborn of the Department of Zoology

From the Captain Marshall Field Brazilian Expedition the Library of the Field Museum has received 144 works, which were immediately useful in identifying and classifying the material collected. Some of these publications could be obtained only by the personal efforts of members of the staff while in Brazil.

== The Marshall Field North Arabian Desert Expeditions ==
The Marshall Field North Arabian Desert Expeditions of 1927-1928 secured twelve specimens of lizards and snakes in Transjordania and Iraq. This material, which proves to be an accession of unusual interest, was collected in 1928 by Mr. Henry Field, Assistant Curator of Physical Anthropology in Field Museum of Natural History.

== The Marshall Field Botanical Expedition to the Amazon ==
The Peruvian division of this expedition, led by Field Museum staff member Llewelyn Williams, returned in May 1930 with 8,000 botanical specimens. The Brazilian division, led by Field Museum Acting Curator D. B. E. Dahlgren, returned several months earlier.

== Literature ==
- John Todd Zimmer: Birds of the Marshall Field Peruvian Expedition, 1922-1923. Chicago, 1930.
- Wilfred Hudson Osgood: The long-clawed South American rodents of the genus Notiomys. Chicago, 1925.
- Carl Eduard Hellmayr: New birds from Chile, by C. E. Hellmayr. Reports on results of the Captain Marshall Field expeditions. Chicago, 1924.
- Karl Patterson Schmidt and F. J. W. Schmidt: New coral snakes from Peru. Reports on results of the Captain Marshall Field expeditions. Chicago, 1925.
- Karl Patterson Schmidt: Notes on Central American crocodiles. Reports on results of the Captain Marshall Field expeditions. Chicago, 1924.
- Karl Patterson Schmidt: Notes on South American caimans. Reports on results of the Captain Marshall Field expeditions. Chicago, 1928.
- Wilfred Hudson Osgood: Review of living caenolestids with description of a new genus from Chile. Reports on results of the Captain Marshall Field expeditions. Chicago, 1924.
- Alfred Cleveland Weed: A review of the fishes of the genus Signalosa. Reports on results of the Captain Marshall Field expeditions. Chicago, 1925.
- J. Francis Macbride: Spermatophytes, mostly Peruvian... Chicago, 1929.
- John Todd Zimmer: Two new birds from Peru. Reports on results of the Captain Marshall Field expeditions. Chicago, 1925.
- J. Francis Macbride and Robert Statham Williams: Various spermatophytes.. Chicago, 1927.
- Bryan Patterson: An adianthine litoptern from the Deseado formation of Patagonia. Results of the Marshall Field paleontological expeditions to Argentina and Bolivia, 1922-27. Field Museum of Natural History, 1940.
- Bryan Patterson: Cranial characters of Homalodotherium. Chicago, Field Museum of Natural History, 1934.
- Bryan Patterson: The internal structure of the ear in some notoungulates. Results of the first Marshall Field paleontological expedition to Argentina and Bolivia, 1922-24. Chicago, 1936
- Bryan Patterson: A new phororhacoid bird from the Deseado formation of Patagonia. Results of the Marshall Field paleontological expeditions to Argentina and Bolivia, 1922-27. Chicago :Field Museum of Natural History, 1941.
- Bryan Patterson: Some notoungulate braincasts. Results of the Marshall Field paleontological expeditions to Argentina and Bolivia, 1922-27. Chicago: Field Museum of Natural History, 1937
- Bryan Patterson: Trachytherus, a Typotherid from the Deseado beds of Patagonia. Results of the first Marshall Field paleontological expedition to Argentina and Bolivia, 1922-24. Chicago: Field Museum of Natural History, 1934
- Bryan Patterson: Upper premolar-molar structure in the notoungulata with notes on taxonomy. Chicago: Field Museum of Natural History, 1934.
