= Felipe Mendez =

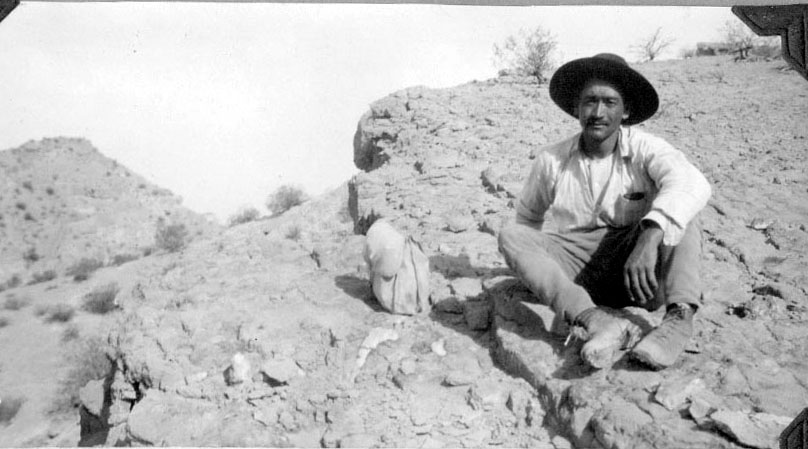
- Felipe Mendez at Armadillo prospect. Puerta Corral Quemado. 1926.
- Born: around 1897; San Juan, Argentina
- Occupation: paleontological collector

Felipe Mendez (born circa 1897 in San Juan, Argentina) was an Argentine man who participated as a paleontological collector at the 2nd Captain Marshall Field Paleontological Expedition in 1926.

The international team included Elmer S. Riggs (Leader and Photographer), Robert C. Thorne (Collector) and Rudolf Stahlecker (Collector). The expedition started in April 1926 and ended in November 1926. The purpose was geological fossil collecting in Catamarca, Argentina. The expedition was successful, and new species such as Stahleckeria were found during this collaboration.
