= Bryan Patterson =

American paleontologist

Bryan Patterson (born 10 March 1909 in London; died 1 December 1979 in Chicago) was an American paleontologist at the Field Museum of Natural History in Chicago.

== Life and career ==
Bryan Patterson was the son of the soldier, engineer and author John Henry Patterson and Frances Helena Gray Patterson, who, in 1890, had been one of the first women to be granted a Doctor of Laws (LLD) degree in the British Isles.

Patterson moved in 1926 to the Hyde Park area of Chicago, Illinois. Upon his arrival in Chicago, Bryan assumed a position as vertebrate preparator at the Field Museum of Natural History. He worked under the direction of Elmer S. Riggs, who was at that time engaged in studies of South American Tertiary mammals. By self-education he rose rapidly in rank, and by 1937 became curator of paleontology.

He became an American citizen in 1938. In 1934 he met and married Bernice Cain. He and Bernice had one son.

He served in Europe with the U.S. Army 1st Infantry Division during World War II. During that time he was taken prisoner by the Germans.

In 1942 he was promoted to curator of mammals, a position he held until 1955 when he left the Field Museum to become the Agassiz Professor of Vertebrate Paleontology in the Museum of Comparative Zoology at Harvard University. In 1947 he was appointed lecturer in geology at the University of Chicago, in parallel to his work at the Museum. As a recipient of two Guggenheim Fellowships he spent the years of 1952–1954 in Argentina studying the great collections amassed by the Ameghino brothers. In 1958 he returned to Argentina with Alfred S. Romer, but this time for field work in the Triassic formations in search of mammal-like reptiles. During 1976–1977, he went to São Paulo, Brazil where he worked with P. E. Vanzolini.

In 1970 he was contracted by the Government of Guatemala to collect remains of extinct mammals at Estanzuela near Guatemala City. These were exhibited at a small museum, featuring the complete skeleton of a mastodon and named Museo de Paleontologia Bryan Patterson.

== Recognition ==
In 1982, C. pattersoni, a species of Conoryctella, was named after Patterson, in recognition of his work on Taeniodonta.

== Publications ==
- Bryan Patterson: An adianthine litoptern from the Deseado formation of Patagonia. Results of the Marshall Field paleontological expeditions to Argentina and Bolivia, 1922-27. Field Museum of Natural History, 1940.
- Bryan Patterson: Cranial characters of Homalodotherium. Chicago, Field Museum of Natural History, 1934.
- Bryan Patterson: The internal structure of the ear in some notoungulates. Results of the first Marshall Field paleontological expedition to Argentina and Bolivia, 1922–24. Chicago, 1936
- Bryan Patterson: A new phororhacoid bird from the Deseado formation of Patagonia. Results of the Marshall Field paleontological expeditions to Argentina and Bolivia, 1922–27. Chicago :Field Museum of Natural History, 1941.
- Bryan Patterson: Some notoungulate braincasts. Results of the Marshall Field paleontological expeditions to Argentina and Bolivia, 1922–27. Chicago: Field Museum of Natural History, 1937
- Bryan Patterson: Trachytherus, a typotherid from the Deseado beds of Patagonia. Results of the first Marshall Field paleontological expedition to Argentina and Bolivia, 1922–24. Chicago: Field Museum of Natural History, 1934
- Bryan Patterson: Upper premolar-molar structure in the notoungulata with notes on taxonomy. Chicago: Field Museum of Natural History, 1934.
