= Robert C. Thorne =

American paleontologist

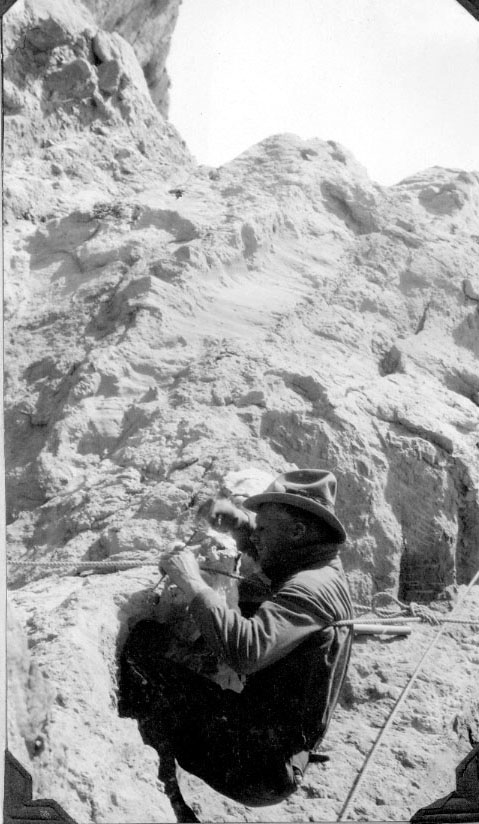
Robert C. Thorne working on Doedicurus skeleton prospect. 1926.

Robert Coin Thorne (25 November 1898 – 27 May 1960) was an American paleontologist.

== Life ==
Thorne was born in Ashley, Utah.

He participated at the 2nd Captain Marshall Field Paleontological Expedition in 1926. Other participants were Elmer S. Riggs (Leader and Photographer), Rudolf Stahlecker (Collector), and Felipe Mendez. The expedition started in April 1926 and finished in November 1926. The purpose was geology fossil collecting in Puerta Corral Quemado, Catamarca, Argentina, South America. The expedition was successful, and even new species like Stahleckeria were found during this collaboration.

He was a veteran of World War I, an experienced outdoors man, mule driver, and fossil collector. He was married to Constance and had with her a son, R. Neil Thorne. His letters about the expedition to his wife have 70 years later been published by their son at his own expense.

He died in Vernal, Utah.
