= Arminiheringia =

Arminiheringia Temporal range: Late Eocene 50 Ma

Scientific classification
- Kingdom: Animalia
- Phylum: Chordata
- Class: Mammalia
- Order: †Sparassodonta
- Family: †Proborhyaenidae
- Genus: †Arminiheringia; Ameghino, 1902
- Species: †A. auceta

Binomial name
- †Arminiheringia auceta Ameghino, 1902

Synonyms
- Arminiheringia cultrata Ameghino, 1902; Dilestes dilobus Ameghino, 1902

Extinct genus of metatherians

Arminiheringia is an extinct genus of sparassodont. It lived during the Early Eocene in South America.

== Description ==
This animal had an exceptionally robust skull with strong teeth. The lower canines were exceptionally long and projected forward. The molars and premolars suggests a carnivorous diet. Its body was probably massive, and the animal reached a considerable size, about 1.8 meters in length. Its legs were strong and sturdy, with a general appearance probably resembling that of a modern bear.

== Classification ==
Arminiheringia was a typical member of the family Proborhyaenidae, a clade of South American bear-like metatherians. Those animals belonged to the order Sparassodonta, a clade related to marsupials whose members, during the course of their evolution, occupied niches ordinarily occupied on other continents by carnivores. Arminiheringia and its relatives superficially resembled creodonts. The only currently recognized species is Arminiheringia auceta. It was closely related to Callistoe.

== Paleobiology ==
Its strong, sturdy body and its skull armed with large teeth are typical indicators of a carnivorous diet; the strange lower canines, elongated forwards, indicates that Arminiheringia was a specialised predator, although its hunting techniques are still a mystery.

== Bibliography ==
- Babot, M. J., Powell, J. E. & de Muizon, C. 2002. Callistoe vincei, a new Proborhyaenidae (Borhyaenoidea, Metatheria, Mammalia) from the Early Eocene of Argentina. Geobios 35, 615–629.
- Bond, M. & Pascual, R. 1983. Nuevos y elocuentes restos craneanos de Proborhyaena gigantea Ameghino, 1897 (Marsupialia, Borhyaenidae, Proborhyaeninae) de la Edad Deseadense. Un ejemplo de coevolución. Ameghiniana 20, 47–60.
- Simpson, G. G. 1932. Skulls and brains of some mammals from the Notostylops beds of Patagonia. American Museum Novitates 578, 1-11.
