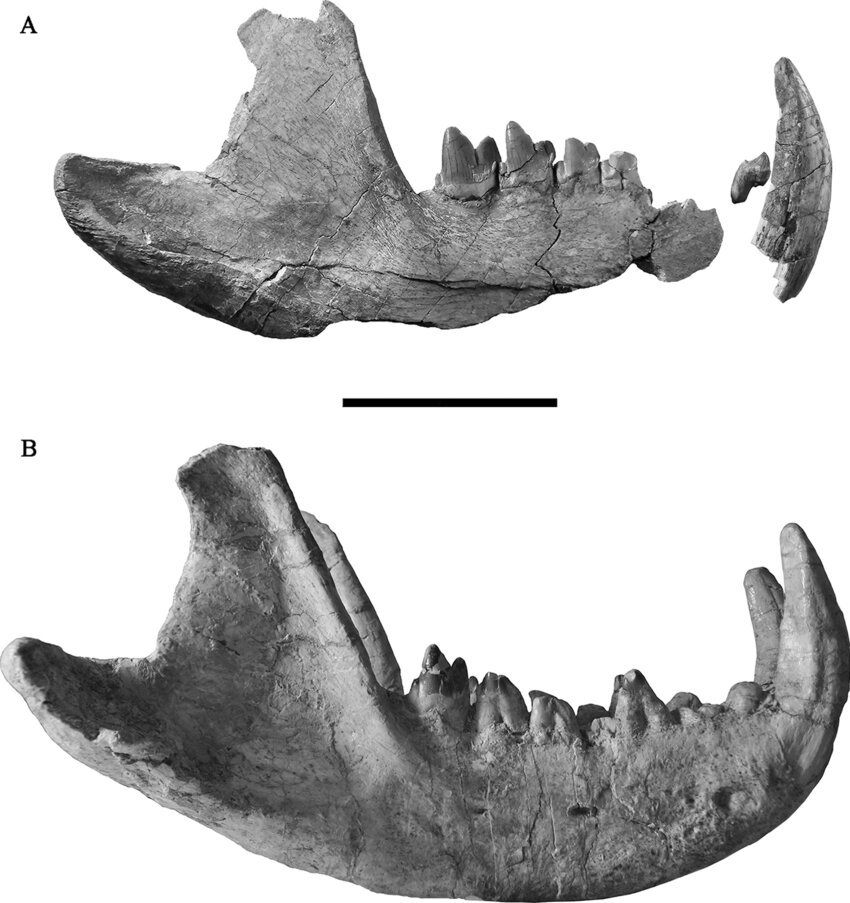
- Mandible of Callistoe vincei. AIBIGEO-P 110, right dentary partially preserved, in lateral view. The position of the isolated canine and p1 was inferred from the proportion in the holotype; B complete dentary of the type specimen (PVL 4187). Scale bar: 5 cm.

Scientific classification
- Kingdom: Animalia
- Phylum: Chordata
- Class: Mammalia
- Order: †Sparassodonta
- Family: †Proborhyaenidae
- Genus: †Callistoe; Babot et al, 2002
- Species: †C. vincei

Binomial name
- †Callistoe vincei Babot et al, 2002

= Callistoe =

Callistoe Temporal range: Early Eocene 50 Ma

Extinct genus of metatherians

Callistoe is an extinct genus of sparassodont. It lived during the Early Eocene, and its fossilized remains were found in South America.

== Description ==
Unlike most of its relatives, such as Proborhyaena and Arminiheringia, Callistoe had a narrow, puny snout, and the shape of its skull resembled that of a thylacine. Callistoe lacked the characteristics associated with the ability to climb in its limbs and vertebrae. The shape of its limb joints, the presence of an ossified patella and the shape of the limb bones show that it was limited to a parasagittal gait, and possessed little flexibility in its elbows, wrists, knees and ankles; Callistoe probably specialized in walking and running. Callistoe, approximately two meters long, had a slender and light body, and weighed approximately 23 kg (51 lb).

== Classification ==
Callistoe vincei was first described in 2002, based on an almost complete and exceptionally preserved skeleton from the Lumbrera Formation, in the Salta Province of Argentina. Its generic name, Callistoe, derives from Callisto, a nymph loved by Zeus, and transformed by him into a bear to protect her from Hera's wrath.

Callistoe was a member of the family Proborhyaenidae, a clade of Sparassodonts typical of the Early Cenozoic, usually large-sized and with a robust build.

== Paleobiology ==
Argot & Babot described in 2011 very long and slightly curved claws, quite different from those of other sparassodonts; their shape suggesting an ability to dig. What appears to be an healed fracture on the front leg of a specimen of Callistoe indicates that those were used intensively. The slender outer toes of the quite short feet indicates an aptitude for running. Callistoe lived alongside a large variety of armadillos and small notoungulates, all animals with fossorial habits, and it is possible that the animal covered large distances and was able to enter the burrows of these animals. As it lived during the Early Eocene, it may be one of the first examples of a predatory mammal with fossorial habits, millions of years before the rise of the first burrowing mustelidae on other continents.

The dental morphology of C. vincei, particularly the presence of a trigonid cutting-edge that was maintained by tooth wear and overeruption, suggests that it was a hypercarnivore.

== Bibliography ==
- Babot, María J.; Jaime E. Powell; Christian de Muizon (2002). "Callistoe vincei a new Proborhyaenidae (Borhyaenoidea, Metatheria, Mammalia) from the Early Eocene of Argentina". Geobios 35 (5): 615–629. doi:10.1016/S0016-6995(02)00073-6.
- Argot, C. & Babot, J. 2011. Postcranial morphology, functional adaptations and palaeobiology of Callistoe vincei, a predaceous metatherian from the Eocene of Salta, north-western Argentina. Palaeontology 54, 411–480.
