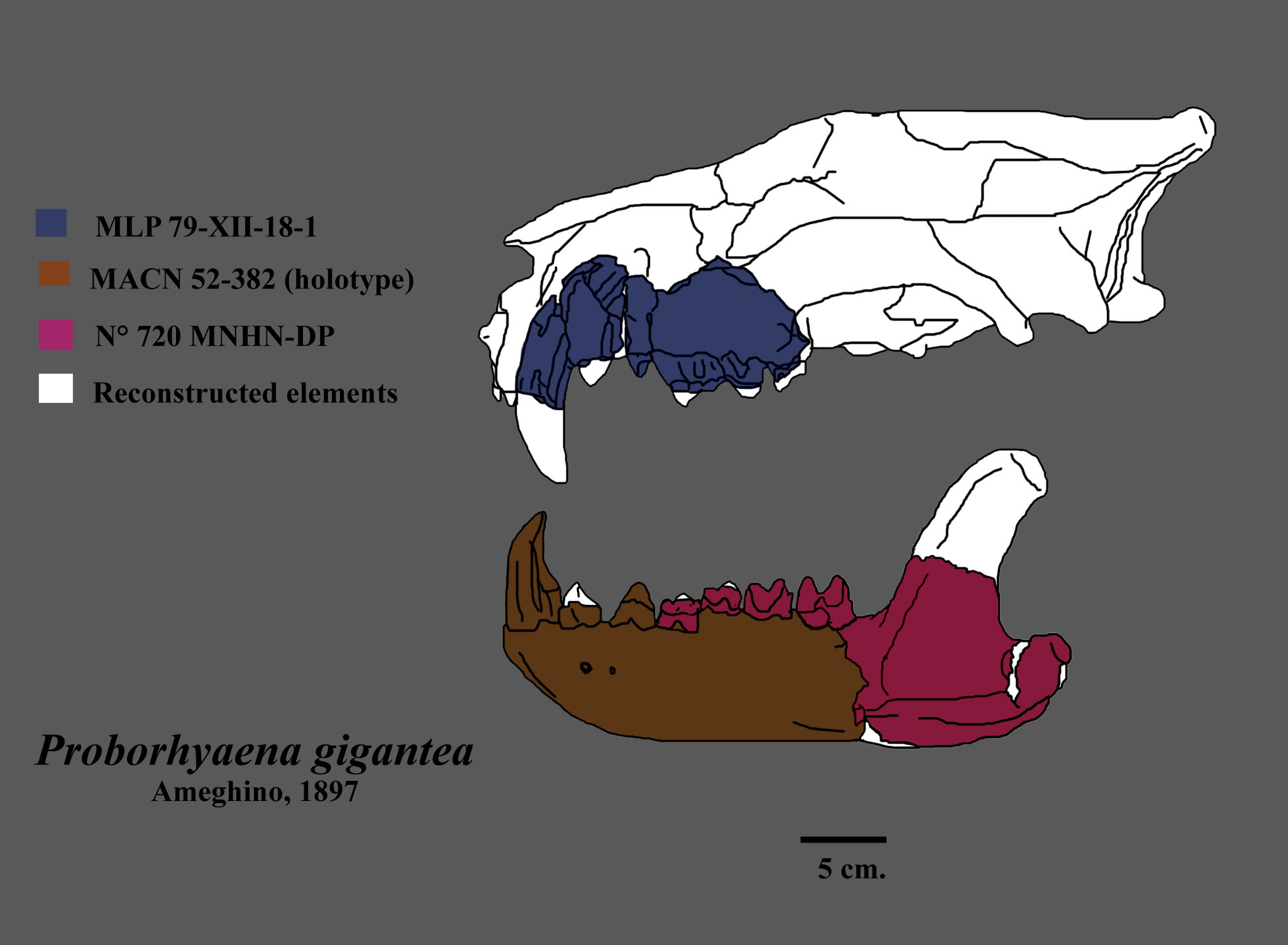
- Skull reconstruction of Proborhyaena

Scientific classification
- Kingdom: Animalia
- Phylum: Chordata
- Class: Mammalia
- Order: †Sparassodonta
- Superfamily: †Borhyaenoidea
- Family: †Proborhyaenidae; Ameghino 1897

Genera
- Arminiheringia Ameghino 1902; Callistoe Babot et al. 2002; Paraborhyaena Hoffstetter & Petter 1982; Proborhyaena Ameghino 1897

Synonyms
- Arminiheringiidae Ameghino 1902

= Proborhyaenidae =

Proborhyaenidae Temporal range: Mid Eocene–Late Oligocene (Mustersan–Deseadan) ~42–23 Ma

Extinct family of mammals

Proborhyaenidae is an extinct family of metatherian mammals of the order Sparassodonta, which lived in South America from the Eocene (Mustersan) until the Oligocene (Deseadan). Sometimes it has been included as a subfamily of their relatives, the borhyaenids (as Proborhyaeninae). The largest species, Proborhyaena gigantea, is estimated to be about the size of a spectacled bear, with its skull reaching 60 cm (2.0 ft) in length, and body mass estimates up to approximately 90–200 kg (200–440 lb), making the proborhyaenids some of the largest known metatherians. Proborhyaenid remains have been found in western Bolivia, Uruguay, southern Brazil, and the provinces of Mendoza, Salta, and Chubut, in Argentina.

Most proborhyaenids had a robust, hyena-like skull, although one species, Callistoe vincei, had an elongate, narrow skull more reminiscent of a thylacine. The teeth were strongly specialized as carnassials for eating meat, and in Arminiheringia rotated throughout the animal's life to maintain a continuous shearing blade on the tooth. Preserved specimens of their canines lack enamel; in life, the enamel may have been very thin or restricted to the tooth tips. In the genus Arminiheringia the lower canines are protruding. Proborhyaenids can be distinguished from other sparassodonts by their grooved upper and lower canines, which grew continuously throughout the animals' lives like rodent incisors. Bond and Pascual (1983) argued that proborhyaenid canines stopped growing in late adulthood based on a specimen from Mendoza Province, Argentina, but the proborhyaenid identity of this specimen is disputed. The presence of open-rooted upper canines in thylacosmilids has led to the suggestion that proborhyaenids are closely related to, or even ancestral to, this group, but this is still controversial.

== Genera ==
- Family Proborhyaenidae
  - Genus Arminiheringia Ameghino 1902 – Argentina
  - Genus Callistoe Babot et al. 2002 – Argentina
  - Genus Paraborhyaena Hoffstetter & Petter 1982 – Bolivia
  - Genus Proborhyaena Ameghino 1897 – Argentina, Bolivia and Uruguay
