= Corral Quemado, Catamarca =

Coordinates: 27°13′39″S 66°56′09″W

Corral Quemado
- Municipality and village
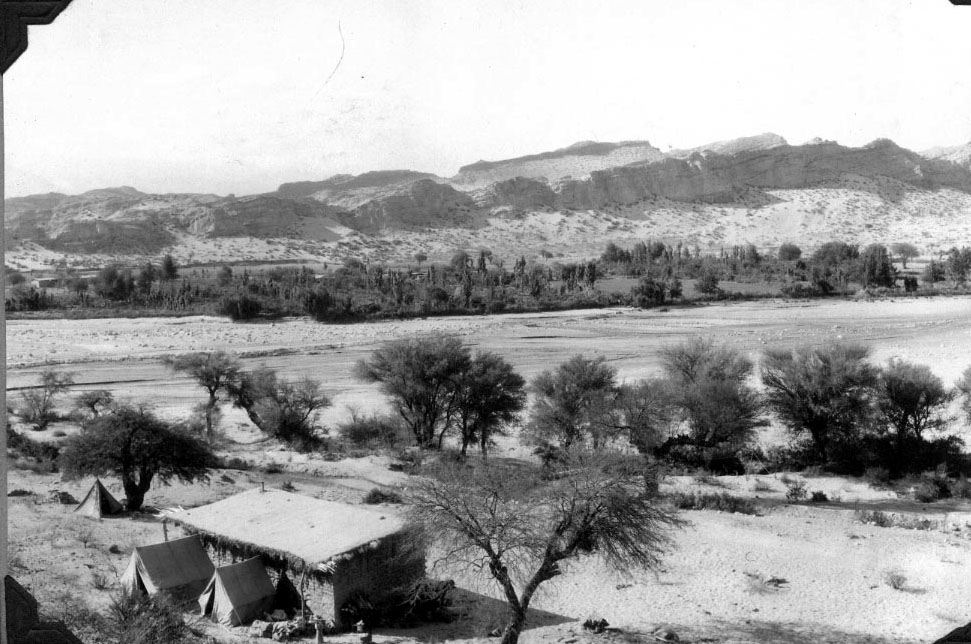
- A fossil collecting expedition camp at Corral Quemado in 1926
- Interactive map of Corral Quemado
- Country: Argentina
- Province: Catamarca Province
- Time zone: UTC−3 (ART)

Corral Quemado is a village and municipality in Catamarca Province in northwestern Argentina.
