= Elmer S. Riggs =

American paleontologist

Elmer Samuel Riggs
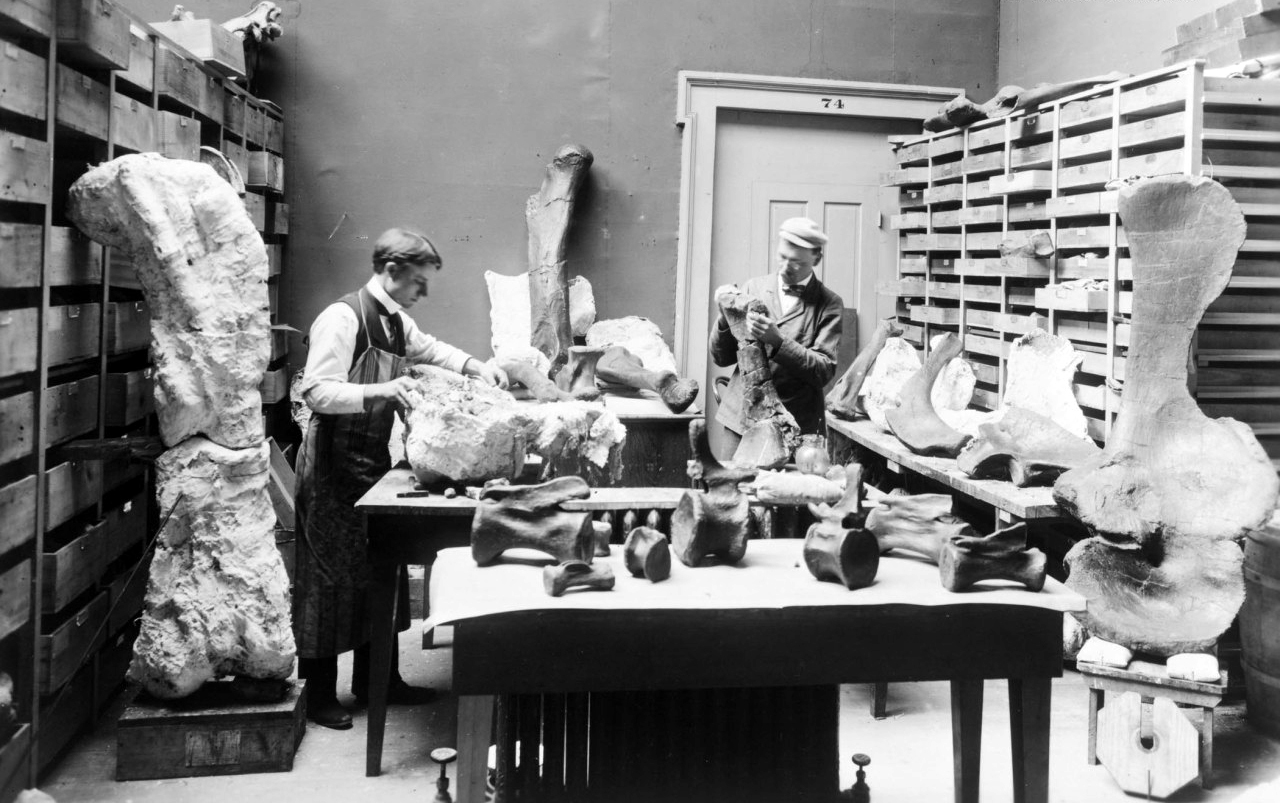
- Riggs (right) and H.William Menke (left) working on Diplodocus and Camarasaurus bones
- Born: January 23, 1869; Trafalgar, Indiana
- Died: March 25, 1963 (aged 94); Sedan, Kansas
- Citizenship: United States
- Education: University of Kansas
- Known for: Brachiosaurus, Thylacosmilus, sauropods as terrestrial animals, Brontosaurus as a junior synonym of Apatosaurus
- Scientific career
- Fields: Paleontology
- Workplaces: American Museum of Natural History; Field Museum of Natural History
- Academic advisors: Samuel Wendell Williston

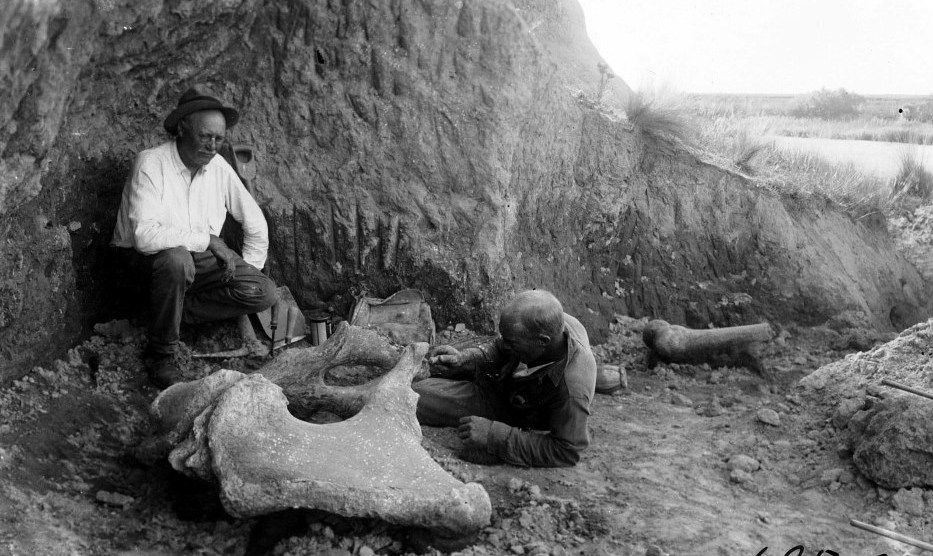
Elmer Riggs (left) and Robt. Thorne (right) excavating Mammut ('southern mastodon') pelvis in situ, Argentina, 1926. Field Museum photo.

Elmer Samuel Riggs (January 23, 1869 – March 25, 1963) was an American paleontologist known for his work with the Field Museum of Natural History in Chicago, Illinois.

== Biography ==
He was born in Trafalgar, Indiana, and moved with his family to Kansas at a young age. He received bachelor's and master's degrees from the University of Kansas and then worked with the American Museum of Natural History. In May 1898 he joined the staff of the Field Museum (then the Field Columbian Museum) as that museum's first paleontologist. Though he was a specialist in fossil mammals, the Field Museum hired him in part to secure dinosaurs for exhibit.

In the summer of 1898 he began with a field season in the Oligocene White River beds of South Dakota and Nebraska working under his department chairman, Oliver Farrington, a meteoriticist. Riggs demonstrated a clear facility for fieldwork and was given the opportunity to lead his own expeditions. He conducted his first Field Museum expedition in 1899 working in the Morrison Formation rocks of Wyoming and Colorado and it was during this expedition that he discovered the first known specimen of Torvosaurus tanneri. After corresponding with an MD during the winter of 1899/1900 he headed to the Morrison Formation in Western Colorado during the summer of 1900. On July 4, 1900, Riggs' assistant, H. William Menke, found the first known skeleton of the giant sauropod dinosaur Brachiosaurus altithorax from near Grand Junction, Colorado. At the end of the 1900 field season Riggs' found a specimen of Apatosaurus near Fruita, a few miles from the Brachiosaurus site. This specimen was excavated during the 1901 field season, and was put on display in 1908 at the Field Museum. From these specimens he named Brachiosaurus and Brachiosauridae, and presented evidence that Apatosaurus and Brontosaurus were the same genus of dinosaur. (Note: As of 2015, they have been confirmed to be separate taxa.) He also proposed that sauropods were terrestrial animals, based on their limb structure, but this was largely dismissed in favor of aquatic sauropods until the 1970s, when the idea was revived by Robert Bakker.

A “little carnivorous dinosaur” fossil that he brought back from Alberta, Canada, in 1922 was determined after field jackets were removed in 1999, to be Gorgosaurus, a tyrannosaurid. Following these discoveries, he returned to fossil mammals, and worked throughout the western United States and South America until 1931. His collection of Argentinian and Bolivian fossil mammals secured on two multi-year expeditions to South America (Captain Marshall Field Expeditions) are his greatest legacy, and are still studied intensively. One particularly notable find was the saber-toothed metatherian Thylacosmilus, which he found in Late Miocene-age rocks of Argentina in 1927 and named in 1933. He became the Curator of Paleontology at the Field Museum, and was employed by the museum until he retired in 1942. He was also sought after as a lecturer, and was still conducting speaking tours many years after retiring from the Field Museum. He died on March 25, 1963, in Sedan, Kansas, at the age of 94.
