= Deseadan =

Period of geologic time (29.0–21.0 Ma)

The Deseadan (Spanish: Deseadense) age is a period of geologic time (29.0–21.0 Ma) within the Oligocene epoch of the Paleogene to the Early Miocene epoch of the Neogene, used more specifically within the SALMA classification of South America. It follows the Tinguirirican and precedes the Colhuehuapian age.

== Etymology ==
The age is named after the Deseado Formation of the Deseado Massif in eastern Patagonia, Argentina.

== Formations ==
Locations of Deseadan formations

Formation bold is type	Country	Basin	Notes
Deseado Formation	Argentina	Deseado Massif	
Abanico Formation	Chile	Abanico Basin	
Agua de la Piedra Formation	Argentina	Precordillera	
Barzalosa Formation	Colombia	Upper Magdalena Valley	
Castillo Formation	Venezuela	Falcón Basin	
Chambira Formation	Peru	Ucayali Basin	
Chilcatay Formation	Peru	Pisco Basin	
Dos Bocas Formation	Ecuador	Progreso Basin	
Fray Bentos Formation	Argentina; Uruguay	Paraná Basin	
Monte León Formation	Argentina	Austral Basin	
Moquegua Formation	Peru	Moquegua Basin	
Mugrosa Formation	Colombia	Middle Magdalena Valley	
Petaca Formation	Bolivia	Subandean Belt	
"Puca Group" - Lacayani fauna	Bolivia	Subandean Belt	
Río Baguales Formation	Chile	Aysén Basin	
Salla Formation	Bolivia	Salla-Luribay Basin	
Sarmiento Formation	Argentina	Golfo San Jorge Basin	
Tremembé Formation/São Paulo Formation	Brazil	Taubaté Basin	

== Fossils ==
Group	Fossils	Formation	Notes
Mammals	Ancylocoelus frequens, A. minor, Archaeohyrax patagonicus, Archaeutatus malaspinensis, Argyrohyrax proavus, Asmodeus osborni, Australohyaena antiqua, Cephalomys arcidens, C. plexus, Chubutomys simpsoni, Deseadomys arambourgi, Liarthrus copei, Litodontomys chubutensis, Meteutatus aff. lagenaformis, Parastrapotherium holmbergi, Progaleopithecus tournoueri, Protosteiromys asmeodeophilus, P. medianus, Prozaedyus aff. impressus, cf. Sallacyon hoffstetteri, Scotamys antiquus, Stenotatus aff. ornatus, Trachytherus spegazzinianus, Astrapotherium sp., Coresodon sp., Deuterotherium sp., Hegetotherium sp., Homalodontotherium sp., Leontinia sp., Nesodon sp., Octodontotherium sp., Trimerostephanos sp., Palaeothentidae indet.	Deseado	
Mammals	Archaeohyrax suniensis, Argyrohyrax proavus, Asmodeus petrasnerus, Fieratherium sorex, Gualta cuyana, Hegetotheriopsis sulcatus, Mendozahippus fierensis, Meteutatus aff. lagenaformis, Proborhyaena gigantea, Prohegetotherium malalhuense, P. schiaffinoi, P. cf. sculptum, Propachyrucos cf. smithwoodwardi, ?Prozaedyus aff. impressus, Pyrotherium romeroi, Stenotatus aff. ornatus, Trachytherus cf. spegazzinianus, cf. Archaeotypotherium sp., Pharsophorus sp., Proadinotherium sp., Progaleopithecus sp., cf. Prosotherium sp., Acaremyidae indet., Glyptodontidae indet., Interatheriidae indet., Litopterna indet., ?Megalonychidae indet., Notohippidae indet., Toxodontidae indet.	Agua de la Piedra	
Mammals	Lophiodolodus chaparralensis, Xenastrapotherium chaparralensis, Proadinotherium sp., Protheosodon sp., Astrapotheriidae indet.	Barzalosa	
Mammals	Canaanimico amazonensis, Chambiramys shipiborum, C. sylvaticus, Deseadomys cf. arambourgi, Loretomys minutus, Palaeosteiromys amazonensis, Plesiosteiromys newelli, Maquiamys praecursor, Ucayalimys crassidens, Abderites sp., aff. Eosallamys sp., cf. Neoglyptatelus sp., Adelphomyinae indet., Anthropoidea indet., Astrapotheriidae indet., ?Caenolestidae indet., Caviomorpha indet., ?Chinchilloidea indet., Emballonuridae indet., ?Erethizontoidea indet., ?Herpetotheriidae indet., Interatheriinae indet, Litopterna indet., Marsupialia indet., Microbiotheria indet., Mylodontidae indet., Mylodontoidea indet., Notoungulata indet., Octodontoidea indet., ?Palaeothentidae indet., Pampatheriidae indet., ?Rhinolophoidea indet., Tolypeutinae indet., Toxodontidae indet., Typotheria indet., Vespertilionoidea indet.	Chambira	
Mammals	Chilcacetus cavirhinus, Huaridelphis raimondii, Incacetus broggii, Macrosqualodelphis ukupachai, Notocetus vanbenedeni, cf. Kentriodon sp., Cetotheriidae indet., Eurhinodelphinidae indet., Mysticeti indet., Odontoceti indet., Pinnipedia indet., Physeteroidea indet., Squalodelphinidae indet.	Chilcatay	
Mammals	Urkudelphis chawpipacha	Dos Bocas	
Mammals	Dasypodon atavus, Eopachyrucos ranchoverdensis, Fiandraia romeii, Palaeopeltis inornatus, Palmiramys waltheri, Proborhyaena cf. gigantea, Prohegetotherium schiaffinoi, Proterotherium berroi, Pseudohegetotherium palmirense, Scarrittia robusta, Trachytherus spegazzinianus, Urotherium interundatum, Uruguaytherium beaulieui, Argyrohyrax sp., Berthawyleria sp., Cephalomyopsis sp., Doellotatus sp., Eoviscaccia sp., Hegetotherium sp., Protypotherium sp., ?Scelidodon sp., ?Vassallia sp., Archaeohyracidae indet., Dasypodidae indet., Euphractini indet., Glyptatelinae indet., Interatheriinae indet., Leontiniidae indet., Machlydotherium indet., Trachytheriinae indet.	Fray Bentos	
Mammals	Odontoceti indet., Phocidae indet.	Gaiman	
Mammals	Diaphorocetus poucheti, Notocetus vanbenedeni, Prosqualodon australis, cf. Kentriodon sp.	Monte León	
Mammals	?Rhynchippus sp.	Petaca	
Mammals	Eoviscaccia boliviana, Trachytherus spegazzinianus, Cephalomyopsis sp., Glyptatelus sp., Prohegetotherium sp., Borhyaenidae indet., Dasypodidae indet., Macraucheniidae indet., Orophodontidae indet.	Lacayani fauna	
Mammals	Anayatherium ekacoa, A. fortis, Andinogale sallensis, Antawallathentes illimani, A. quimsacruza, Archaeohyrax suniensis, Branisamys luribayensis, Branisella boliviana, Brucemacfaddenia boliviensis, Cephalomys bolivianus, ?Coniopternium primitivum, Eurygenium pacegnum, Evolestes hadrommatos, Federicoanaya sallaensis, Incamys bolivianus, Kuntinaru boliviensis, Luribayomys masticator, Migraveramus beatus, Notogale mitis, Palaeothentes boliviensis, Paraborhyaena boliviana, Paroctodontotherium calleorum, Pascualihippus boliviensis, Pharsophorus lacerans, Proargyrolagus bolivianus, Prohegetotherium schiaffinoi, Pseudoglyptodon sallaensis, Pyrotherium macfaddeni, cf. Pyrotherium romeroi, Ronwolffia pacifica, Rhynchippus cf. brasiliensis, Sallacyon hoffstetteri, Salladolodus deuterotherioides, Sallamys pascuali, Sallatherium altiplanense, Thadanius hoffstetteri, Trachytherus alloxus, Tricoelodus boliviensis, cf. Acamana sp., cf. Eocoleophorus sp., Glyptatelus sp., aff. Neoreomys sp., Peltephilus sp., Astrapotheriidae indet., Borhyaeninae indet., Dasypodidae indet., Dasyproctidae indet., Megalonychidae indet., Nesodontinae indet., Polydolopidae indet.	Salla	
Mammals	Acarechimys leucotheae, Ancylocoelus frequens, Archaeohyrax patagonicus, Archaeophylus patrius, Archaeotypotherium propheticus, Archaeutatus malaspinensis, Argyrohyrax proavus, Asmodeus osborni, Asteromys punctus, Australohyaena antiqua, Bryanpattersonia sulcidens, Cephalomys arcidens, C. ceciae, C. plexus, Changquin woodi, Chubutomys navaensis, C. simpsoni, Clypeotherium magnum, Coresodon scalpridens, Cramauchenia normalis, Deseadomys arambourgi, Deuterotherium distichum, Draconomys verai, Elmerriggsia fieldia, Eomicrobiotherium matutinum, Eopachyrucos pliciformis, ?Eoviscaccia australis, Epiklohnia verticalis, Ethelomys loomisi, Eurygenium latirostris, Eutrachytherus grandis, Galileomys baios, Hegetotheriopsis sulcatus, Henricofilholia lustrata, H. vucetichia, Hondonadia parca, H. cf. pumila, Incamys bolivianus, I. menniorum, Kramadolops maximus, Leontinia gaudryi, Leucokephalos zeffiae, Liarthrus copei, Litodontomys chubutensis, Llitun notuca, Loncolicu tretos, Maddenia lapidaria, Medistylus dorsatus, Meteutatus lagenaformis, Notodiaphorus crassus, Notogale mitis, Palaeopeltis inornatus, Palaeothentes chubutensis, P. lucina, P. praecursor, Parabderites minusculus, Parastrapotherium holmbergi, Parutaetus ?chilensis, Patagonhippus canterensis, P. dukei, Pharsophorus lacerans, P. tenuis, Pilchenia intermedia, Platypittamys brachyodon, Proadiantus excavatus, P. gibbus, Proadinotherium leptognathus, Proborhyaena gigantea, Proeuphractus setiger, Progaleopithecus fissurellatus, P. tournoueri, Prohegetotherium sculptum, Propachyrucos ameghinorum, Prosotherium garzoni, P. triangulidens, ?Protacaremys adilos, Protarchaeohyrax minor, Protheosodon coniferus, Protosteiromys asmodeophilus, P. medianus, Prozaedius impressus, P. planus, Pseudhalmarhiphus guaraniticus, Pyrotherium sorondoi, Rhynchippus equinus, R. pumilus, Rosendolops cf. ebaios, Sadypus tortuosus, Santiagorothia chiliensis, Scarrittia barranquensis, S. canquelensis, Scotamys antiquus, ?Stenotatus aff. ornatus, Trachytherus spegazzinianus, Tricoelodus bicuspidatus, Vallehermosomys mazzonii, ?V. merlinae, Barrancatatus sp., Cephalomyopsis sp., Cochilius sp., Evolestes sp., Octodontotherium sp., Peltephilus sp., Prohegetotherium sp., Trachytherus sp., Caviomorpha indet., ?Chinchilloidea indet., ?Dasyproctidae indet., cf. Eobranisamys indet., Eocardiidae indet., Henricosborniidae indet., Interatheriinae indet., Isotemnidae indet., Macraucheniidae indet., Palaeothentidae indet., Pichipilidae indet., Propalaehoplophorinae indet., Rodentia indet., Stegotheriini indet., Toxodontia indet.	Sarmiento	
Mammals	cf. Leontinia gaudryi	São Paulo	
Mammals	Moqueguahippus glycisma, Rhynchippus cf. pumilus, Sallamys quispea, Trachytherus ramirezi, T. cf. spegazzinianus, cf. Coniopternium sp., cf. Dasypodinae indet., Hegetotheriidae indet., Macraucheniidae indet., Proterotheriidae indet.	Moquegua	
Birds	Cladornis pachypus, Cruschedula revola	Deseado	
Birds	cf. Andrewsornis sp.	Agua de la Piedra	
Birds	Palaeospheniscus sp.	Chilcatay	
Birds	Devincenzia gallinali	Fray Bentos	
Birds	Eretiscus tonnii, Palaeospheniscus patagonicus, Palaeospheniscus wimani, Paraptenodytes antarcticus	Gaiman	
Birds	Arthrodytes andrewsi, Paraptenodytes brodkorbi, P. robustus, Pseudospheniscus concavus	Monte León	
Birds	Spheniscidae indet.	Río; Baguales	
Birds	Phorusrhacidae indet.	Salla	
Birds	Physornis sp.	Sarmiento	
Birds	Paraphysornis brasiliensis, Taubatornis campbelli	Tremembé	
Birds	Phorusrhacidae indet.	Moquegua	
Reptiles & amphibians	Balanerodus logimus, Gavialidae indet.	Barzalosa	
Reptiles & amphibians	?Balanerodus sp., Podocnemis sp., cf. Purussaurus sp., cf. Sebecus sp., Anura indet., Booidea indet., Caimaninae indet., Colubroidea indet., Gavialoidea indet., Serpentes indet.	Chambira	
Reptiles & amphibians	Testudines indet.	Chilcatay	
Reptiles & amphibians	Testudinidae indet.	Fray Bentos	
Reptiles & amphibians	Eusuchia indet., Sebecosuchia indet.	Mugrosa	
Reptiles & amphibians	?Chelonoidis sp.	Petaca	
Reptiles & amphibians	cf. Calyptocephalella sp., Testudines indet.	Salla	
Reptiles & amphibians	Calyptocephalella canqueli, Neoprocoela edentatus, Eupsophus sp., ?Madtsoia sp., Iguaninae indet., Sebecidae indet.	Sarmiento	
Reptiles & amphibians	Caiman tremembensis	Tremembé	
Fishes	cf. Hydrolycus sp., Leporinus sp., cf. Phractocephalus sp., Potamotrygon sp., Actinopterygii indet., Cichlidae indet., ?Erythrinidae indet., Loricariidae indet., Pimelodidae indet.	Chambira	
Fishes	Carcharhinus cf. brachurus, Carcharodon hastalis, Carcharodon subauriculatus, Hemipristis cf. serra, Isurus desori	Chilcatay	
Fishes	Carcharodon hastalis, Carcharoides catticus, Echinorhinus pozzii, Galeocerdo aduncus, Lamna totuserrata, Megascyliorhinus trelewensis, Heterodontus sp., Labrodon sp., Sphyrna sp., Squatina sp., Molidae indet., Myliobatoidea indet.	Gaiman	
Fishes	Isurus dolloi, Striatolamia macrota, Abdounia sp.	Río; Baguales	
Fishes	Taubateia paraiba	Tremembé	
Insects	?Archaeodrapetiops elongata, A. mezzalirai, A. nefera, A. transversa, Archaeolycorea ferreirai, Eternia papaveroi, Indusia suguioi, Kleopathra nemogypsia, K. noctodiva, Microbasis longinota, Neorinella garciae, Parafitopteryx duarteae, Paratilgidopsis praecursora, Petisca dryellina, Philodarchia cigana, Psephenella ferreirai, ?Tabanus tremembeensis, Taubocicadellina breviptera, Taubarixa macrocelata, Tauborixella santosae, Tauborixiellopsis breviclavata, Taubatehymen minuta, Tremembaetalion minutum, Tremembecarabus rotundus, Tremembella gracilis, Tremembellina microcelata, Trulaxia primula, Curculioninae indet., Hydrophilidae indet.	Tremembé	

== Correlations ==
The Deseadan South American land mammal age (SALMA) is equivalent to the Arikareean in the North American land mammal age (NALMA) and the Harrisonian in the 2000 version of the classification. It overlaps with the Hsandagolian of Asia and the MP 25 zone of Europe, the Waitakian and the Landon epoch of New Zealand.

Deseadan correlations in South America
Formation	Agua	Rancahué	Guillermo	Deseado	Sarmiento	Salla	Lacayani	Fray Bentos	Moquegua	Chambira	Barzalosa	Tremembé	Cascadas	Map
Basin	Neuquén		Austral	Deseado	San Jorge	Salla	Subandean	Norte	Moquegua	Ucayali	VSM	Taubaté	Panama	Deseadan (South America)
Country	Argentina					Bolivia		Uruguay	Peru		Colombia	Brazil	Panama	Deseadan (South America)
Archaeohyrax														Deseadan (South America)
Prohegetotherium														Deseadan (South America)
Pyrotherium														Deseadan (South America)
Pharsophorus														Deseadan (South America)
Trachytherus														Deseadan (South America)
Proadinotherium														Deseadan (South America)
Proborhyaena														Deseadan (South America)
Meteutatus														Deseadan (South America)
Andrewsornis														Deseadan (South America)
Terror birds														Deseadan (South America)
Rodents														Deseadan (South America)
Reptiles														Deseadan (South America)
Primates														Deseadan (South America)
Flora														Deseadan (South America)
Insects														Deseadan (South America)
Environments	Alluvial		Fluvial	Fluvial		Alluvial	Fluvial-alluvial	Fluvial	Fluvio-lacustrine		Alluvial-fluvial	Lacustrine	Fluvial	Deseadan volcanoclastics Deseadan fauna Deseadan flora
Volcanic	Yes				Yes	Yes	Yes		Yes				Yes	Deseadan volcanoclastics Deseadan fauna Deseadan flora
