= Ronwolffia =

Ronwolffia Temporal range: Late Oligocene (Deseadan) ~29–21 Ma

Scientific classification
- Domain: Eukaryota
- Kingdom: Animalia
- Phylum: Chordata
- Class: Mammalia
- Order: Cingulata
- Family: †Peltephilidae
- Genus: †Ronwolffia; Shockey, 2017
- Species: †R. pacifica

Binomial name
- †Ronwolffia pacifica Shockey, 2017

Extinct genus of mammals

Ronwolffia is an extinct genus of horned armadillo (Peltephilidae), distantly related to the modern species of armadillos and to the extinct glyptodonts. It lived during the Oligocene in what is now the Salla Formation in Bolivia.

== History and etymology ==
Remains associated with Ronwolffia were originally collected in 1964 by Alberto Elier in the Salla Formation They were only described in 2008, in two studies by Shockey and Anaya (for postcranial elements, assigned to Cf. Peltephilus sp.), and by Kearney and Shockey (for the cranial remains), the last one concerning the future holotype of the genus, YPM VPPU 020700. Both studies were the basis of a later study by Shockey in 2017 creating the new genus and species Ronwolffia pacifica for the large peltephilid remains from the formation, while the remaining material was assigned to Peltephilidae sp. indet.

Ronwolffia was named to honour Ronald Wolff, a member of the Department of Zoology at the University of Florida. The species name, pacifica, meaning in Latin "pacific", reflects the new understanding of peltephilid diets.

== Description ==
Ronwolffia was a medium-sized peltephilid, sharing the U-shaped dental arcade, the robust skull with eight strong teeth in each row that caused the family to be formerly considered as carnivores, the short rostrum, and the wide osteoderms, whose most recognizable were the two horn-like osteoderms in the tip of the cranium. Its skull was as broad but shorter than the skull of the giant armadillo. Its diagnostic features from other peltephilids involved a longer palate than Parapeltecoelus, a smaller sagittal crest than Peltephilus strepens, and it had an arched anterior dental arcade and a flat cranial vault. It was roughly the same size than the later Peltephilus atrox. Its auditory bulla was still incompletely ossified compared to later species.

== Paleoecology ==
Ronwolffia pacifica may have shared its environment with at least one other still undescribed species of peltephilid. Deseadan rocks from the Salla Formation also yielded the oldest cranial remains of dasypodids and fossils of glyptodonts, mylodontids such as Paroctodontotherium, an indeterminate megalonychid, and of the stem-sloth Pseudoglyptodon. Primates such as Branisella were also present, as well as various rodents such as the agoutis Incamys, Branisamys and Cephalomys and the octodontids Migraveramus and Sallamys. The herbivorous fauna was completed by various meridiungulates, such as astrapotheres, Pyrotherium, the proterotheriid (or possibly didolodontid) Salladolodus, the macraucheniid Coniopternium, the adianthids Thadanius and Tricoelodus, the typotheres Trachytherus, Prohegetotherium and Sallatherium, the leontiniid Anayatherium, the notohippids Eurygenium, Pascualihippus and Rhynchippus, and the toxodontid Proadinotherium. Marsupials were also present, such as the predatory sparassodonts Fredszalaya, Pharsophorus, Notogale, Sallacyon and Paraborhyaena, the caenolestids Evolestes and Palaeothentes, and the argyrolagids Proargyrolagus.

While once believed to have been active predators, due in part to their canine-like teeth, it is now commonly believed that members of the Peltephilidae were burrowing animals, searching the soil for tubers, and perhaps occasionally eating carrion.
