= Sarmiento Formation =

Geologic formation in Chubut Province, Argentina

- Stratigraphic range: Bartonian-Burdigalian (Casamayoran-Colhuehuapian); ~50–17.5 Ma
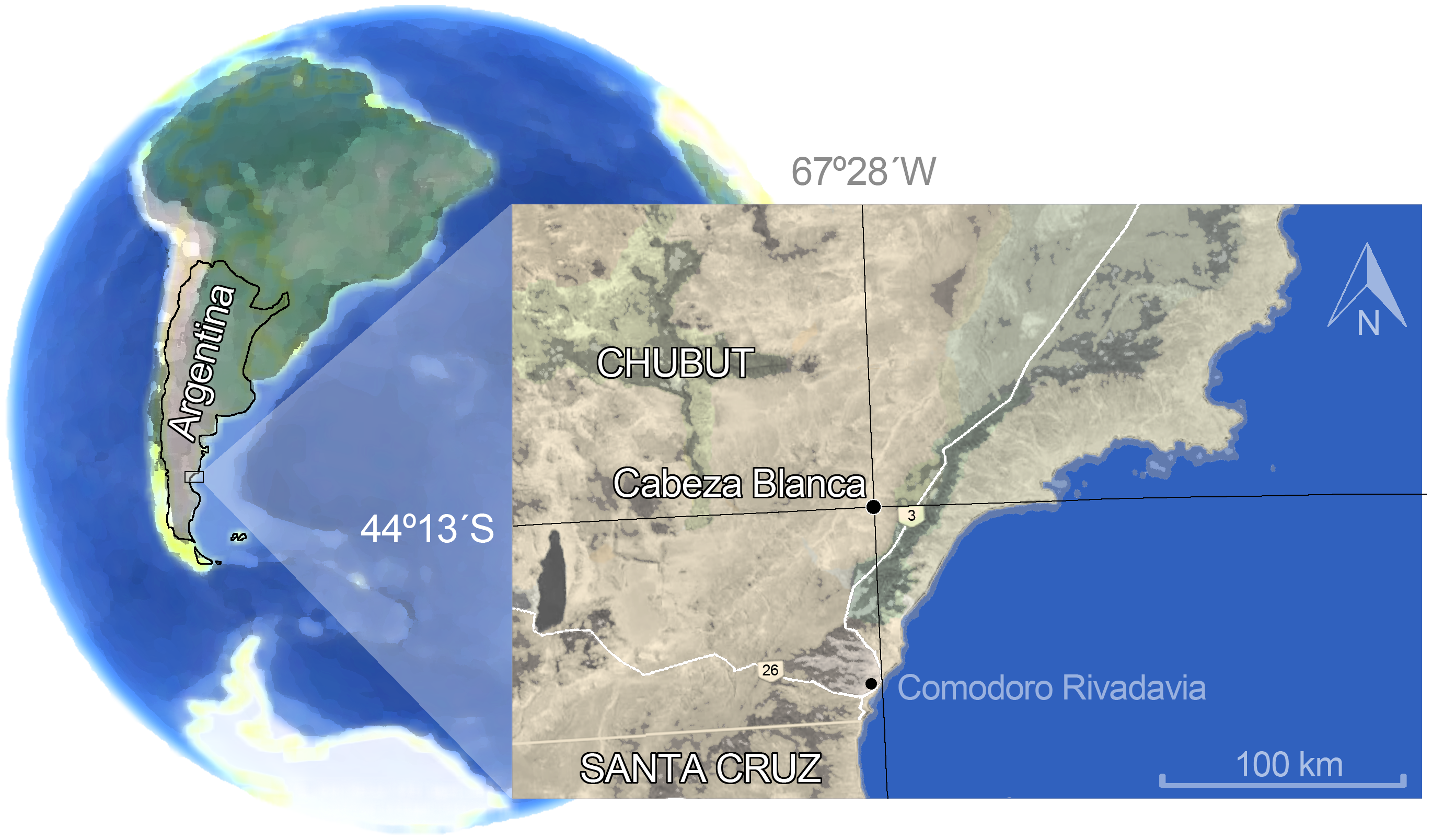
- Sub-units: Colhué Huapí Member, Gran Barranca Member, Puesto Almendra Member, Rosado Member, Trelew Member, and Vera Member
- Underlies: Chenque Formation; Gaiman Formation
- Overlies: Koluel Kaike Formation (Río Chico Group)
- Thickness: 319 metres

Lithology
- Primary: Sandstone, mudstone
- Other: Limestone

Location
- Country: Argentina
- Extent: Golfo San Jorge Basin

Type section
- Named for: Sarmiento, Chubut
- Region: Chubut Province
- Country: Argentina
- Thickness at type section: 319 metres (1,047 ft) (tuffs)
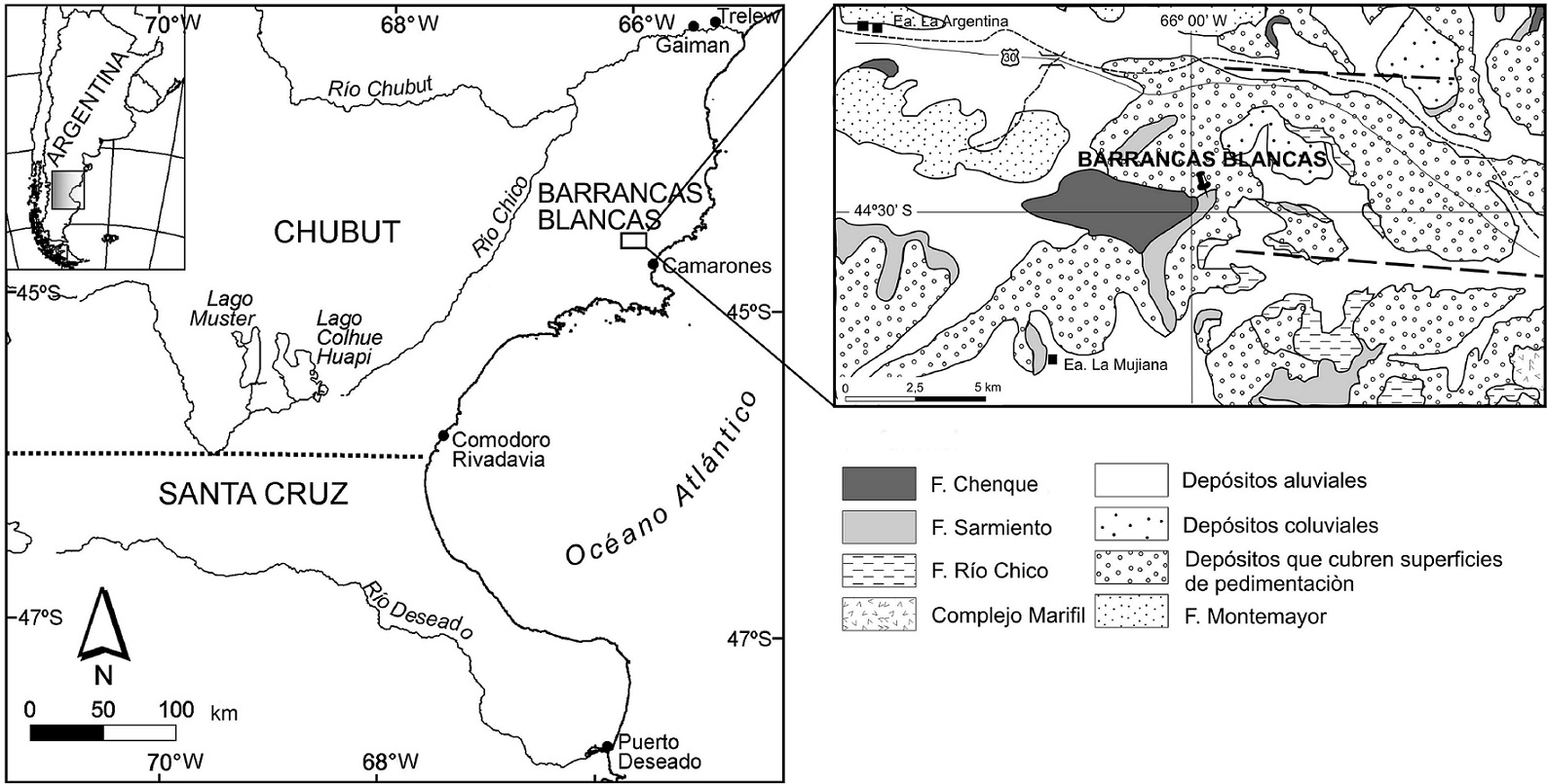
- Location of the Sarmiento Formation within Argentina

The Sarmiento Formation (Spanish: Formación Sarmiento), in older literature described as the Casamayor Formation, is a geological formation in Chubut Province, Argentina, in central Patagonia, which spans around 30 million years from the mid-Eocene to the early Miocene. It predominantly consists of pyroclastic deposits, which were deposited in a semi-arid environment. It is divided up into a number of members. The diverse fauna of the Sarmiento Formation, including a variety of birds, crocodilians, turtles and snakes, also includes many mammals such as South American native ungulates (notoungulates, litopterns, astrapotheres) as well as armadillos, and caviomorph rodents. Some trace fossils have also been found, such as Teisseirei.

== Paleofauna ==
=== Amphibians ===
Name	Species	Member/Locality	Material	Notes	Image
Anura indet.	Currently undescribed	Upper Puesto Almendra Member			
Calyptocephalella	C. canqueli	Upper Puesto Almendra Member		A calyptocephalellid frog	
Eupsophus	E. sp.	Upper Puesto Almendra Member		An alsodid frog	
Neoprocoela	N. edentatus	Upper Puesto Almendra Member		A leptodactylid frog	

=== Birds ===
Name	Species	Member/Locality	Material	Notes	Image
Andrewsornis	A. abotti	Upper Puesto Almendra Member		A phorusrhacid	
Loxornis	L. clivus	Upper Puesto Almendra Member			
Physornis	P. sp.	Upper Puesto Almendra Member		A phorusrhacid	
Telmabates	T. antiquus	Upper Puesto Almendra Member		A presbyornithid	

=== Reptiles ===
==== Crocodylomorphs ====
Name	Species	Member/Locality	Material	Notes	Image
Eocaiman	E. cavernensis	Gran Barranca Member		A caiman	
Sebecus	S. icaeorhinus	Gran Barranca Member	Disarticulated skull, mandible, and some postcranial material.	A sebecid notosuchian.	

==== Lepidosaurs ====
Name	Species	Member/Locality	Material	Notes	Image
Chubutophis	C. grandis	Gran Barranca Member		A boa snake	
Gaimanophis	G. tenuis	Trelew Member		A boa snake	
Iguanidae indet.	Currently undescribed	Upper Puesto Almendra Member			
Madtsoia	M. bai M. sp.	Gran Barranca and Upper Puesto Almendra Members		A madtsoiid snake	
Waincophis	W. australis	Gran Barranca Member		A boa snake	

==== Testudines ====
Name	Species	Member	Material	Notes	Image
Chelonoidis	C. gringorum	Trelew Member		A tortoise	
Gaffneylania	G. auricularis			A meiolaniid stem-turtle	
Niolamia	N. argentina	Gran Barranca Member		A meiolaniid stem-turtle	
Testudininae indet.	Currently undescribed	Puesto Almendra Member		A tortoise	

=== Mammals ===
==== Meridiolestidans ====
Name	Species	Member/Locality	Material	Notes	Image
Necrolestes	N. mirabilis	Colhué Huapí Member		Youngest known meridiolestidan	

==== Meridiungulates ====
Name	Species	Member/Locality	Material	Notes	Image
Acoelodus	A proclivus	Gran Barranca Member		A notoungulate of uncertain affinities.	
Acoelohyrax	A. sigma A. complicatissimus	Gran Barranca Member		A notohippid notoungulate	
Adiantoides	A. magnus	Gran Barranca Member		An indaleciid litoptern	
Albertogaudrya	A. carahuasensis A. unica	Gran Barranca Member		An astrapothere	
Amilnedwardsia	A. brevicula	Gran Barranca Member			
Ancylocoelus	A. frequens	Puesto Almendra Member		A leontiniid notoungulate	
Anisolambda	A. amel A. fissidens	Gran Barranca Member		A proterotheriid litoptern	
Anisotemnus	A. distentus	Gran Barranca and Vera Members		An isotemnid notoungulate	
Antepithecus	A. brachystephanus A. innexus	Gran Barranca and Rosado Members		A notopithecid notoungulate	
Archaeohyrax	A. patagonicus	Gran Barranca and Puesto Almendra Members		A archaeohyracid notoungulate	
Archaeophylus	A. patrius	Puesto Almendra Member		A interatheriid notoungulate	
Archaeopithecus	A. rogeri	Gran Barranca Member		A archaeopithecid notoungulate	
Archaeotypotherium	A. propheticus	Puesto Almendra and Vera Members		An archaeohyracid notoungulate	
Argyrohippus	A. boulei A. fraterculus A. praecox	Colhué Huapí and Puesto Almendra Members			
Argyrohyrax	A. proavus	Puesto Almendra Member			
Asmodeus	A. osborni	Puesto Almendra Member			
Astraponotus	A. assymmetrus A. dicksoni A. dilatatus A. holdichi A. thompsoni	Gran Barranca Member			
Astrapotherium	A. ruderarium	Colhué Huapí member			
Astrapotheriidae indet.	Currently undescribed	Colhué Huapí Member			
Bryanpattersonia	B. sulcidens	Puesto Almendra and Vera Members		Genus probably a synonym of Archaeotypotherium	
Cochilius	C. brevirostris C. fumensis C. volvens	Colhué Huapí and Puesto Almendra Members			
Colpodon	C. distinctus C. propinquus C. sp.	Colhué Huapí Member		A leontiniid.	
Coniopternium	C. andinum	Puesto Almendra Member		A macraucheniid litoptern	
Cramauchenia	C. normalis	Colhué Huapí and Puesto Almendra Members	Nearly complete skull and humerus	A macraucheniid litoptern	
Cramaucheniinae indet.	Currently undescribed	Puesto Almendra Member			
Deuterotherium	D. distichum	Puesto Almendra Member			
Didolodus	D. multicuspsis D. magnus D. minor D. latigonus	Gran Barranca and Rosado Members	All species mostly known from dental remains	A didolodontid.	
Edvardotrouessartia	E. sola	Gran Barranca Member			
Eohyrax	E. isotemnoides E. platyodus E. praerusticus	Gran Barranca and Rosado Members			
Eolicaphrium	E. primarium	Gran Barranca Member		A litoptern	
Eomorphippus	E. bondi E. neilopdykei E. obscurus	Rosado and Lower Puesto Almendra members		A notohippid notoungulate	
Eopachyrucos	E. pliciformis E. pliciferus	Rosado and Puesto Almendra Members	Mandibular and skull remains	An interatheriid.	
Ernestohaeckelia	E. aculeata E. acutidens	Gran Barranca Member		A litoptern	
Ernestokokenia	E. nitida E. patagonica	Gran Barranca Member	Mostly known from dental remains	A didolodontid.	
Eurygenium	E. latirostris	Puesto Almendra Member		A notohippid notoungulate	
Guilielmofloweria	G. plicata	Gran Barranca Member		A proterotheriid.	
Guilielmoscottia	G. plicifera	Rosado and Vera Members		A interatheriid notoungulate	
Hegetotheriopsis	H. sulcatus	Trelew Member			
Hegetotherium	H. novum	Trelew Member		A hegetotheriid notoungulate	
Homalostylops	H. atavus H. parvus	Gran Barranca and Rosado Members		A notostylopid notoungulate	
Henricofilholia	H. lustrata H. cingulata H. circumdata H. intercincta H. vucetichia	Upper Puesto Almendra Member		An astrapothere	
Henricosbornia	H. ampla H. lophodonta H. minuta	Gran Barranca Member			
Interatherium	I. sp.	Colhué Huapí Member		An interatheriid	
Isotemnus	Isotemnus ctalego Isotemnus haugi Isotemnus latidens Isotemnus primitivus	Gran Barranca Member			
Isotemnidae indet.	Currently undescribed	Puesto Almendra Member			
Lambdaconus	L. lacerum	Colhué Huapí Member			
Leontinia	L. gaudryi L. sp.	Puesto Almendra Member			
Maddenia	M. lapidaria	Puesto Almendra Member			
Maxschlosseria	M. consumata M. expansa M. minima M. minuta M. praeterita M. rusticula M. septa	Gran Barranca Member		An oldfieldthomasiid notoungulata	
Medistylus	M. dorsatus	Puesto Almendra Member			
Morphippus	M. complicatus M. fraternus M. hypselodus M. imbricatus M. quadrilobus	Puesto Almendra Member			
Notopithecus	N. adapinus	Gran Barranca and Rosado Members			
Notostylops	N. murinus N. appressus N. pendens N. pigafettai N. sp.	Gran Barranca and Rosado Members			
Oldfieldthomasia	O. anfractuosa O. debilitata O. parvidens O. transversa	Gran Barranca Member			
Othnielmarshia	O. curviristra O. lacunifera O. reflexa	Gran Barranca Member			
Pachyrukhos	P. sp.	Colhué Huapí Member			
Paginula	P. parca	Gran Barranca Member			
Paramacrauchenia	P. scamnata P. inexspectata	Colhué Huapí Member			
Parastrapotherium	P. cingulatum P. ephebicum P. holmbergi P. lemoinei P. trouessarti P. sp.	Colhué Huapí and Puesto Almendra Members			
Patagonhippus	P. canterensis P. dukei	Puesto Almendra Member		A notohippid notoungulate	
Paulogervaisia	P. inusta	Gran Barranca and Rosado Members			
Peripantostylops	P. minutus	Gran Barranca Member			
Periphragnis	P. exauctus P. sp.	Rosado Member			
Pleurostylodon	P. complanatus P. crassiramis P. modicus	Gran Barranca Member		An isotemnid notoungulate	
Polymorphis	P. lechei	Gran Barranca Member		A macraucheniid litoptern	
Proadiantus	P. excavatus	Puesto Almendra Member			
Proadinotherium	P. leptognathus	Puesto Almendra Member		A toxodontid notoungulate	
Proargyrohyrax	P. curanderensis P. sp.	Vera Member		An interatheriid notoungulate	
Proectocion	P. argentinus P. precisus	Gran Barranca Member		An adianthid litoptern	
Progaleopithecus	P. fissurellatus P. tournoueri P. sp.	Puesto Almendra Member		A interatheriid notoungulate	
Prohegetotherium	P. sculptum P. sp.	Puesto Almendra Member			
Proheptaconus	P. patagonicus	Colhué Huapí and Trelew Members		An adianthid litoptern	
Prolicaphrium	P. spectabile P. specillatum	Colhué Huapí Member		A proterotheriid litoptern	
Propachyrucos	P. smithwoodwardi	Puesto Almendra Member			
Propyrotherium	P. saxeum	Gran Barranca Member			
Prosotherium	P. garzoni	Puesto Almendra Member			
Protarchaeohyrax	P. minor	Puesto Almendra Member		A archaeohyracid notoungulate	
Proterotheriidae indet.	Currently undescribed	Puesto Almendra Member			
Protheosodon	P. coniferus	Puesto Almendra Member			
Protypotherium	P. sp.	Colhué Huapí Member			
Pseudhyrax	P. eutrachytheroides	Puesto Almendra Member			
Pternoconius	P. polymorphoides P. tournoueri P. bondi	Colhué Huapí and Puesto Almendra Members			
Puelia	P. sigma P. coarctatus	Gran Barranca, Rosado, and Vera Members		A notohippid notoungulate	
Pyrotherium	P. romeroi	Puesto Almendra Member			
Rhynchippus	R. pumilus R. equinus R. sp.	Puesto Almendra Member			
Rosendo	R. pascuali	Vera Member		A notohippid notoungulate	
Rutimeyeria	R. conulifera	Gran Barranca Member		A litoptern	
Santiagorothia	S. chiliensis	Vera Member			
Scaglia	S. kraglievichorum	Gran Barranca Member			
Scarrittia	S. canquelensis S. barranquensis	Puesto Almendra Member			
Sparnotheriodon	S. epsilonoides	Gran Barranca Member			
Teratopithecus	T. elpidophoros	Gran Barranca Member			
Tetragonostylops	T. apthomasi	Gran Barranca Member			
Tetramerorhinus	T. sp.	Colhué Huapí Member			
Teushentherium	T. camaronensis	Puesto Almendra Member			
Theosodon	T.? frenguellii	Colhué Huapí Member			
Thomashuxleya	T. rostrata	Gran Barranca Member		An isotemnid notoungulate	
Trachytherus	T. spegazzinianus T. sp.	Puesto Almendra Member			
Transpithecus	T. obtentus T. sp.	Gran Barranca and Rosado Members			
Tricoelodus	T. bicuspidatus	Puesto Almendra Member		An adianthid litoptern	
Trigonolophodon	T. elegans T. inflatus	Puesto Almendra Member		A homalodotheriid notoungulate	
Trigonostylops	T. wortmani T. sp.	Gran Barranca Member		An astrapothere	
Ultrapithecus	U. rutilans	Gran Barranca and Rosado Members			
Victorlemoinea	V. labyrinthica V. emarginata V. longidens V. sp.	Gran Barranca Member			

==== Xenarthrans ====
Name	Species	Member/Locality	Material	Notes	Image
Archaeutatus	A. malaspinensis A. sp.	Upper Puesto Almendra Member			
Astegotherium	A. dichotomum	Gran Barranca Member			
Barrancatatus	B. rigidus B. maddeni B. sp.	Vera and Upper Puesto Almendra Members			
Clypeotherium	C. magnum	Upper Puesto Almendra Members			
Cochlops	C. sp.	Colhué Huapí Member			
Glyptodontinae indet.	Currently undescribed	Colhué Huapí and Upper Puesto Almendra Members			
Hapaloides	H. ignavus H. laeviusculus H. ponderosus H. sp.	Colhué Huapí Member			
Holomegalonyx	H. menendezi	Colhué Huapí Member			
Machlydotherium	M. ater M. sparsum M. sp.	Gran Barranca, Rosado, Upper Puesto Almendra, and Vera Members			
Mazzoniphractus	M. ingens	Rosado Member			
Megalonychidae indet.	Currently undescribed	Colhué Huapí Member			
Meteutatus	M. anthinus M. ascendens M. concavus M. confluens M. lagenaformis M. lucidus M. minutus M. nepotulus M. percarinatus M. tortuosus M. sp.	Gran Barranca, Rosado, Upper Puesto Almendra, and Vera Members			
Nematherium	N. sp.	Colhué Huapí Member			
Octodontotherium	O. grande O. crassidens	Upper Puesto Almendra Member			
Palaeopeltis	P. inornatus	Upper Puesto Almendra Member			
Parutaetus	P. chicoensis P. chilensis P. clusus P. signatus	Gran Barranca, Rosado, Upper Puesto Almendra, and Vera Members			
Peltephilus	P. pumilus P. undulatus P. sp.	Colhué Huapí and Upper Puesto Almendra Members			
Peltephilidae indet.	Currently undescribed	Colhué Huapí, Rosado, Upper Puesto Almendra, and Vera Members			
Proeuphractus	P. setiger	Upper Puesto Almendra Member			
Proeutatus	P. oenophorum Proeutatus robustus P. sp.	Colhué Huapí Member			
Propalaehoplophorus	P sp.	Colhué Huapí Member			
Proplatyarthrus	P longipes	Vera Member			
Proschismotherium	P. oppositum P. sp.	Colhué Huapí Member			
Prostegotherium	P. astrifer P. notostylopianum P. sp.	Gran Barranca Member			
Prozaedyus	P. humilis P. impressus P. planus P. sp.	Colhué Huapí and Upper Puesto Almendra Members			
Pseudoglyptodon	P. chilensis	Gran Barranca and Upper Puesto Almendra Members			
Stegosimpsonia	S. chubutanum	Colhué Huapí, Gran Barranca, and Rosado Members			
Stegotherium	S. caroloameghinoi S. pascuali S. tessellatum S. variegatum	Colhué Huapí Member			
Stegotheriini indet.	Currently undescribed	Colhué Huapí, Rosado, Upper Puesto Almendra, and Vera Members			
Stenotatus	S. centralis S. patagonicus S. ornatus S sp.	Colhué Huapí, Upper Puesto Almendra, and Vera Members			
Utaetus	U. buccatus U. deustus U. laevus U. lenis	Gran Barranca and Rosado Members			

==== Metatherians ====
Name	Species	Member/Locality	Material	Notes	Image
Abderites	A. meridionalis	Colhué Huapí Member			
Abderitidae indet.	Currently undescribed	Colhué Huapí Member			
Acdestodon	A. bonapartei	Upper Puesto Almendra Member			
Acdestoides	A. praecursor	Upper Puesto Almendra Member			
Acrocyon	A. riggsi	Colhué Huapí Member			
Acyon	A. tricuspidatus	Colhué Huapí Member			
Amphidolops	A. serrula	Gran Barranca Member			
Anargyrolagus	A. primus	Trelew Member			
Angelocabrerus	A. daptes	Gran Barranca Member			
Arctodictis	A. sinclairi	Colhué Huapí Member			
Arminiheringia	A auceta	Gran Barranca Member			
Australohyaena	A. antiqua	Upper Puesto Almendra Member			
Borhyaena	B. macrodonta	Colhué Huapí Member			
Caenolestoides	C. miocaenicus	Colhué Huapí Member			
Canchadelphys	C. cristata	Vera Member			
Carlothentes	C. chubutensis	Upper Puesto Almendra Member			
Caroloameghinia	C. mater C. tenuis	Gran Barranca Member			
Cladosictis	C. centralis C sp.	Colhué Huapí Member			
Clenia	C. minuscula C. brevis	Colhué Huapí and Vera Members			
Coona	C. gaudryi C. gutierrezi C. pattersoni	Gran Barranca Member			
Didelphimorphia indet.	Currently undescribed	Colhué Huapí Member			
Eomicrobiotherium	E. matutinum E. mykerum	Colhué Huapí, Trelew, Upper Puesto Almendra, and Vera Members			
Epikhlonia	E. verticalis	Vera Member			
Eudolops	E. tetragonus	Gran Barranca Member			
Evolestes	E. sp.	Upper Puesto Almendra Member			
Gaimanlestes	G. pascuali	Trelew Member			
Hathliacynidae indet.	Currently undescribed	Colhué Huapí and Vera Members			
Hondonadia	H. fierroensis H. parca H. praecipitia H. pumila	Upper Puesto Almendra and Vera Members			
Kramadolops	K. fissuratus K. hernandezi K. maximus K. mayoi	Gran Barranca, Upper Puesto Almendra, and Vera Members			
Microbiotherium	M. praecursor M. sp.	Colhué Huapí and Vera Members			
Microbiotheriidae indet.	Currently undescribed	Colhué Huapí Member			
Nemolestes	N. spalacotherinus	Gran Barranca Member			
Notogale	N. mitis	Upper Puesto Almendra Member			
Oligobiotherium	O. divisum	Colhué Huapí Member			
Patagonia	P. peregrina	Trelew Member		A metatherian of uncertain placement	
Pachybiotherium	P. acclinum	Colhué Huapí Member			
Palaeothentes	P. marshalli P. migueli P. minutus	Colhué Huapí and Upper Puesto Almendra Members			
Palaeothentidae indet.	Currently undescribed	Colhué Huapí and Upper Puesto Almendra Members			
Parabderites	P. bicrispatus P. minisculus	Colhué Huapí and Upper Puesto Almendra Members			
Periakros	P. ambiguus	Vera Member			
Pharsophorus	P. lacerans P. tenax	Upper Puesto Almendra Member			
Pichiplidae indet.	Currently undescribed	Upper Puesto Almendra and Vera Members			
Pilchenia	P. antiqua P. intermedia P. lobata P. lucina	Upper Puesto Almendra and Vera Members			
Polydolops	P. crassus P. serra P. tetragonus P. thomasi P. unicus	Gran Barranca Member			
Praedens	P. aberrans	Vera Member			
Proargyrolagus	P. argentinus	Colhué Huapí Member			
Proborhyaena	P. gigantea	Upper Puesto Almendra Member			
Procladosictis	P. erecta	Gran Barranca Member			
Progarzonia	P. notostylopense	Gran Barranca Member			
Pseudothylacynus	P. rectus	Colhué Huapí Member			
Rosendolops	R. ebaios R. primigenium	Gran Barranca, Upper Puesto Almendra, and Vera Members			
Rosendolopidae indet.	Currently undescribed	Upper Puesto Almendra and Vera Members			
Sipalocyon	S. externus S. sp.	Colhué Huapí Member			
Stilotherium	S. parvum	Colhué Huapí Member			
Thylacosmilidae indet.	Currently undescribed	Colhué Huapí Member			
Trelewthentes	T. rothi	Upper Puesto Almendra Member			

==== Rodents ====
Name	Species	Member/Locality	Material	Notes	Image
Acarechimys	A. leucotheae A. minutissimus A sp.	Colhué Huapí, Puesto Almendra, and Trelew Members			
Acaremys	A. preminutus A. murinus A. sp.	Colhué Huapí and Trelew Members			
Asteromys	A. punctus A. sp.	Upper Puesto Almendra Member			
Australoprocta	A. fleaglei	Trelew Member			
Banderomys	B. leanzai	Colhué Huapí Member			
Branisamyopsis	B. australis	Colhué Huapí Member			
Caviocricetus	C. lucasi	Colhué Huapí and Trelew Members			
Caviomorpha indet.	Currently undescribed	Upper Puesto Almendra Member			
Cephalomyidae indet.	Currently undescribed	Upper Puesto Almendra Member			
Cephalomyopsis	C. hipselodontus	Puesto Almendra and Trelew Members			
Cephalomys	C. arcidens	Upper Puesto Almendra Member			
Changquin	C. woodi	Upper Puesto Almendra Member			
Chinchilloidea indet.	Currently undescribed	Colhué Huapí Member			
Chubutomys	C. simpsoni C. leucoreios	Trelew and Upper Puesto Almendra Member			
Deseadomys	D. arambourgi	Puesto Almendra Member			
Dudumus	D. ruigomezi	Trelew Member			
Draconomys	D. verai	Puesto Almendra Member			
Eobranisamys	E sp.	Puesto Almendra Member			
Eocardiidae indet.	Currently undescribed	Puesto Almendra Member			
Eosteiromys	E. homogenidens E. segregatus E. sp.	Colhué Huapí and Trelew Members			
Eoviscaccia	E. australis	Colhué Huapí, Puesto Almendra, and Trelew Members			
Ethelomys	E. loomisi	Upper Puesto Almendra Member			
Hypsosteiromys	H. nectus H. axiculus	Colhué Huapí Member			
Incamys	I. bolivianus I. menniorum	Puesto Almendra Member			
Leucokephalos	L. zeffiae	Upper Puesto Almendra Member			
Litodontomys	L chubtensis	Upper Puesto Almendra Member			
Llitun	L. notuca	Upper Puesto Almendra Member			
Loncolicu	L. tretos	Upper Puesto Almendra Member			
Luantus	L. initialis L. minor L. propheticus L. sp.	Colhué Huapí and Trelew Members			
Neoepiblemidae indet.	Currently undescribed	Colhué Huapí Member			
Neoreomys	N. pinturensis	Colhué Huapí Member			
Paradelphomys	P. fissus	Colhué Huapí Member			
Parasteiromys	P. friantae P. uniformis	Colhué Huapí Member			
Perimys	P. incavatus P. transversus P. dissimilis P. sp.	Colhué Huapí and Trelew Members			
Platypittamys	P. brachyodon	Upper Puesto Almendra Member			
Prospaniomys	P. priscus P. sp.	Colhué Huapí and Trelew Members			
Prostichomys	P. bowni	Colhué Huapí Member			
Protacaremys	P. adilos P. avunculus P. prior P. pulchellus P. sp.	Colhué Huapí and Upper Puesto Almendra Members			
Protadelphomys	P. latus P. sp.	Colhué Huapí and Trelew Members			
Saremmys	S. ligcura	Colhué Huapí and Trelew Member			
Scotamys	S. antiquus	Upper Puesto Almendra Member			
Soriamys	S. gaimanensis S. ganganensis S. sp.	Colhué Huapí and Trelew Members			
Willidewu	W. estaparius	Trelew Member			
Vallehermosomys	V mazzonii	Upper Puesto Almendra Member			
Xylechimys	X. obliquus	Upper Puesto Almendra Member			

==== Primates ====
Name	Species	Member/Locality	Material	Notes	Image
Dolichocebus	D. gaimanensis	Trelew Member			
Homunculus	H. sp.	Colhué Huapí Member			
Mazzonicebus	M. almendrae	Colhué Huapí Member			
Tremacebus	T. harringtoni	Colhué Huapí Member			

==== Bats ====
Name	Species	Member/Locality	Material	Notes	Image
Mormopterus	M. barrancae M. sp.	Colhué Huapí Member			
Phyllostominae indet.	Currently undescribed	Colhué Huapí Member			
