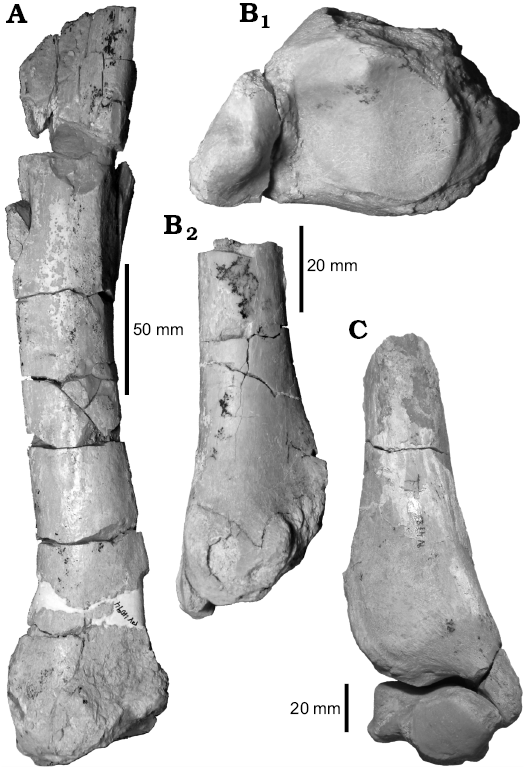
- Tibiae of Gualta

Scientific classification
- Domain: Eukaryota
- Kingdom: Animalia
- Phylum: Chordata
- Class: Mammalia
- Order: †Notoungulata
- Family: †Leontiniidae
- Genus: †Gualta; Cerdeño and Vera, 2015
- Species: †G. cuyana

Binomial name
- †Gualta cuyana Cerdeño & Vera, 2015

= Gualta cuyana =

Gualta cuyana Temporal range: Late Oligocene (Deseadan) ~28–23 Ma

Extinct genus of notoungulates

Gualta is an extinct genus of leontiniid notoungulates. It lived during the Late Oligocene of what is now Argentina.

== Description ==
This genus is known from numerous fossil remains including an almost complete skull, several vertebrae, numerous maxillaries and mandibular fragments and postcranial elements from several different individuals, permitting to reconstruct its appearance. Gualta was an animal of considerable size with a heavy build, and it may have exceeded two meters in length. The skull was relatively tall, and Gualta was very similar to one of its relatives from the same period, Scarrittia. Like the latter, Gualta had the first upper incisor much more developed than the two others, and the canine that overlapped the first premolar. However, unlike Scarrittia, it had a more elongated snout, narrower and longer nasal bones; its third and fourth premolars had a low lingual sulcus; it had a shorter cervical vertebra, and an even shorter calcaneus without navicular facet. Unlike other leontiniids such as Leontinia, Ancylocoelus, Anayatherium or Colpodon, Gualta still had a complete dentition.

== Classification ==
Gualta cuyana was first described in 2015, based on fossil remains found in the Late Oligocene Agua de la Piedra Formation, in Mendoza Province of Argentina. The phylogenetic analysis proposed in the study of the first description indicates that Gualta was a leontiniid, a group of heavy-formed Notoungulates, widespread in South America during the Oligocene. Gualta seems to be closely related to Anayatherium and Scarrittia, but may have also been ancestral to other forms of leontiniids.

== Paleobiology ==
The fossils of Gualta make up a low percentage of the mammal diversity at Quebrada Fiera, in contrast to other localities in Brazil and Patagonia, where leontiniids are among the most well represented families of notoungulates.
