= Colhuehuapian =

Period of geologic time (21.0–17.5 Ma)

The Colhuehuapian age is a period of geologic time (21.0–17.5 Ma) within the Early Miocene epoch of the Neogene, used more specifically within the SALMA classification in South America. It follows the Deseadan and precedes the Santacrucian age.

== Etymology ==
The age is named after the Colhué Huapí Member of the Sarmiento Formation in the Golfo San Jorge Basin, Patagonia, Argentina.

== Formations ==
Locations of Colhuehuapian formations

Formation bold is type	Country	Basin	Notes
Colhué Huapí Member	Argentina	Golfo San Jorge Basin	
Abanico Formation	Chile	Abanico Basin	
Biblián Formation	Ecuador	Cuenca Basin	
Castillo Formation	Venezuela	Falcón Basin	
Cerro Bandera Formation	Argentina	Neuquén Basin	
Chichinales Formation	Argentina	North Patagonian Massif	
Chilcatay Formation	Peru	Pisco Basin	
Cura-Mallín Group	Chile	Cura-Mallín Basin	
Gaiman Formation	Argentina	Valdés Basin	
Gran Bajo del Gualicho Formation	Argentina	Colorado Basin	
Monte León Formation	Argentina	Austral Basin	
Montera Formation	Peru	Sechura Basin	
Pirabas Formation	Brazil	Amazon Basin	
Río Jeinemeni Formation	Argentina	Austral Basin	
Uitpa Formation	Colombia	Cocinetas Basin	

== Fossils ==
Group	Fossils	Formation	Notes
Mammals	Abderites meridionalis, Acarechimys cf. minutissimus, Acaremys cf. murinus, A. preminutus, Acrocyon riggsi, Acyon tricuspidatus, Anargyrolagus primus, Arctodictis sinclairi, Argyrohippus cf. boulei, ?Astrapotherium ruderarium, Australoprocta fleaglei, Borhyaena macrodonta, Branisamyopsis australis, Caviocricetus lucasi, Cephalomyopsis hipselodontus, Cladosictis centralis, Clenia minuscula, Colpodon distinctus, Cramauchenia normalis, Dolichocebus gaimanensis, Dudumus ruigomezi, Eomicrobiotherium mykerum, Eosteiromys homogenidens, E. segregatus, Eoviscaccia australis, Euphractus patagonicus, Gaimanomys alwinea, Galileomys antelucanus, Hypsosteiromys axiculus, H. nectus, Licaphrops festinus, Luanthus initialis, Luantus propheticus, Mazzonicebus almendrae, Mormopterus barrancae, Necrolestes mirabilis, Neoreomys pinturensis, Oligobiotherium divisum, Pachybiotherium acclinum, Palaeothentes ?minutus, Parabderites bicrispatus, Paradelphomys fissus, Parasteiromys friantae, P. uniformis, Parastrapotherium symmetrum, Patagonia peregrina, Peltephilus pumilus, Perimys dissimilis, P. incavatus, P. transversus, Proargyrolagus argentinus, Proheptaconus patagonicus, Prolicaphrium spectabile, Prospaniomys priscus, Prostichomys bowni, Protacaremys avunculus, P. prior, P. pulchellus, Protadelphomys latus, Prozaedyus humilis, Pseudostegotherium glangeaudi, Pseudothylacynus rectus, Pternoconius bondi, Sipalocyon externus, Soriamys gaimanensis, S. ganganensis, Stegotherium tesselatum, S. variegatum, Tremacebus harringtoni, Willidewu estaparius, Acarechimys sp., Interatherium sp., Microbiotherium sp., Nematherium sp., Pachyrukhos sp., Proeutatus sp., Protypotherium sp., Prozaedyus sp., Soriamys sp., Tetramerorhinus sp., Titanothentes sp., Argyrolagoidea indet., Caluromyinae indet., ?Cephalomyidae indet., Chinchilloidea indet., Dasypodidae indet., Didelphidae indet., Didelphimorphia indet., Didelphoidea indet., Glyptodontidae indet., Hathlyacininae indet., Leontiniidae indet., Marsupialia indet., Megalonychidae indet., Neoepiblemidae indet., Phyllostominae indet., Propalaehoplophorinae indet., Thylacosmilidae indet.	Colhué Huapí	
Mammals	Chilecebus carrascoensis, Notoungulata indet., Rodentia indet.	Abanico	
Mammals	Xenastrapotherium aequatorialis	Biblián	
Mammals	Banderomys leanzai, Caviocricetus lucasi, Comahuetherium coccaorum, Cramauchenia normalis, Doryperimys olsacheri, Eoviscaccia australis, Garridomys curunuquem, Leucokephalos maior, Proadinotherium cf. muensteri, Protypotherium sinclairi, Abderites sp., Astrapothericulus sp., Cladosictis sp., Eosteiromys sp., Palaeothentes sp., Parastrapotherium sp., Perimys sp., Pitheculites sp., Proeutatus sp., Protypotherium sp., Prozaedyus sp., Sipalocyon sp., Stenotatus sp., Astegotheriini indet., Borhyaenidae indet., Hegetotheriidae indet., Macraucheniidae indet., Peltephilidae indet., Platyrrhini indet., Propalaehoplophorinae indet., Proterotheriinae indet.	Cerro; Bandera	
Mammals	Australoprocta fleaglei, Caviocricetus lucasi, Cladosictis cf. patagonica, Eoviscaccia australis, Willidewu esteparius, cf. Colpodon sp., Hegetotherium sp., Octodontoidea sp., Proeutatus sp., cf. Protypotherium sp., cf. Stenotatus sp., Interatheriidae indet., Mesotheriinae indet., Nesodontinae indet., Propalaehoplophorinae indet., Proterotheriinae indet.	Chichinales	
Mammals	Ensidelphis riveroi, Inticetus vertizi, Notocetus vanbenedeni, Pinnipedia indet., Platanidelphidi indet.	Chilcatay	
Mammals	Colpodon antucoensis, Acarechimys sp., Luantus sp., Protacaremys sp., Protypotherium sp., Sipalocyon sp., Echimyidae indet.	Cura-Mallín	
Mammals	Aglaocetus moreni, Aondelphis talen, Argyrocetus patagonicus, Idiorophus patagonicus, Morenocetus parvus, Phoberodon arctirostris, Plesiocetus dyticus, Prosqualodon australis, Kentriodon sp., Eurhinodelphinidae indet., Squalodontidae indet.	Gaiman	
Mammals	Metaxytherium crataegense	Montera	
Mammals	Dioplotherium allisoni, Sirenotherium pirabense, Metaxytherium sp., Rytiodus sp., Dugongidae indet.	Pirabas	
Mammals	Phanomys mixtus	Río; Jeinemení	
Birds	Falconidae indet.	Cerro; Bandera	
Birds	Opisthodactylus horacioperezi, Patagorhacos terrificus, Psilopteridae indet.	Chichinales	
Birds	Palaeospheniscus sp.	Chilcatay	
Birds	Apterodytes ictus, Eretiscus tonnii, Palaeospheniscus affinis, P. bergi, P. bilocular, P. gracilis, P. intermedius, P. interruptus, P. patagonicus, P. planus, P. rothi, Paraptenodytes antarcticus, P. robustus, Treleudytes crassa, Arthrodytes sp., Anseriformes indet., Sphenisciformes indet.	Gaiman	
Reptiles	Gaimanophis tenuis, Waincophis sp., Colubridae indet.	Colhué Huapí	
Reptiles	Geochelone sp., Pleurodira indet.	Chichinales	
Reptiles	Crocodylia indet., Gavialoidea indet., Pleurodira indet.	Pirabas	
Fish	Alopias superciliosus, Alopias cf. vulpinus, Anotodus agassizii, Carcharhinus brachyurus, Carcharhinus cf. leucas, Carcharocles chubutensis, Carcharodon hastalis, Cosmopolitodus plicatilis, Galeocerdo aduncus, Hemipristis serra, Isurus desori, Isurus oxyrinchus, Megachasma cf. applegatei, Megalolamna paradoxodon, Negaprion brevirostris, Parotodus benedeni, Physogaleus contortus, Sphyrna zygaena, cf. Anoxypristis sp., Carcharias sp., Squatina sp., Dasyatidae indet., Myliobatoidea indet.	Chilcatay	
Fish	Carcharhinus ackermanii, C. egertoni, C. priscus, Carcharodon subauriculatus, Diodon ferreirai, Galeocerdo paulinoi, Ginglymostoma obliquum, G. serra, Hemipristis serra, Isurus novus, Nebrius obliquus, Rhinoptera studeri, Scoliodon taxandriae, Sphyraena cunhai, S. egleri, Sphyrna magna, S. prisca, Arius sp., Hypoprion sp., Myliobatis sp.	Pirabas	
Fish	Heptranchias cf. howellii, Centrophorus sp., Dalatias cf. licha, Pristiophorus sp., Isurus cf. oxyrinchus, Carcharocles sp., Alopias cf. superciliosus, Hemipristis serra, Carcharhinus gibbesii, Sphyrna laevissima, Mobula sp., Lamniformes indet., Teleostei indet.	Uitpa	
Decapods	Acanthocarpus obscurus, Arenaeus cribarius, Calappilia broksi, Callinectes cf. declivis, C. ferreirai, C. paraensis, C. pirabensis, C. reticulatus, Cyclocancer tuberculatus, Euphylax septendentatus, Hepatella amazonica, Necronectes tajinensis, Paratumidocarcinus marajoarus, Panopeus capanemensis, Parthenope tuberculata, Portunus atecuicitilis, P. haitensis, P. pirabensis, P. spimanus, P. spinimanus, Scylla costata, Sesarma paraensis, Tasadia tuberculatus, Tetraxanthus rathbunae, Typilobus unispinatus, Randallia sp.	Pirabas	
