= Eoviscaccia =

Eoviscaccia Temporal range: Early Oligocene-Early Miocene (Tinguirirican-Colhuehuapian) ~33.9–17.5 Ma

Scientific classification
- Kingdom: Animalia
- Phylum: Chordata
- Class: Mammalia
- Order: Rodentia
- Family: Chinchillidae
- Genus: †Eoviscaccia; Vucetich, 1989

Type species
- †Eoviscaccia boliviana Vucetich, 1989

Species
- E. australis Vucetich, 1989; E. boliviana Vucetich, 1989; E. frassinettii Bertrand et al. 2012

Extinct genus of rodents

Eoviscaccia is an extinct genus of chinchillid rodent that lived during the Early Oligocene (Tinguirirican) to the Early Miocene (Colhuehuapian) in what is now South America. Fossils of this genus have been found in the Cerro Bandera, Chichinales, Fray Bentos, and Sarmiento Formations of Argentina, the Salla Formation of Bolivia, and the Abanico Formation of Chile.

== Taxonomy ==
Eoviscaccia was first described by María Guiomar Vucetich in 1989 based on remains found in the Salla Formation of Bolivia and the Sarmiento Formation of Chubut Province, Argentina, with the proposed type species being Eoviscaccia boliviana. Two other species, E. australis and E. frassinettii, were both named in 1989 and 2012 respectively, with E. australis being found in Chubut, Entre Ríos, Neuquén, and Río Negro Provinces of Argentina, while E. frassinettii was found in the Abanico Formation of Chile.

The following cladogram of the Caviomorpha is based on Busker et al. 2020, showing the position of Eoviscaccia.

- - - Baluchimyinae
      Bugtimys zafarullahi
  - - - "Phiomorpha"
        - Phiomys andrewsi
        - Metaphiomys schaubi
    - - - Octodontoidea
          - Prospaniomys priscus
          - - Myocastor coypus
            - - - Echimyidae
                  - Proechimys polioplus
                  - - Eumysops laeviplicatus
                    - - Kannabaetomys amblyonyx
                      - Echimys chrysurus
              - - - Ctenomyidae
                    Ctenomys australis
                - - - Plataeomys brevis
                    - Pithanotomys columnaris
                  - - Octomys mimax
                    - - Octodontomys gliroides
                      - - Chasichimys bonaerense
                        - Chasicomys octodontiforme
                        - - Acarechimys leucotheae
                          - Acarechimys minutus
                          - Acaremyidae
                            - Acaremys murinus
                            - Galileomys antelucanus
                            - Galileomys baios
      - - - Erethizontoidea
            - Steiromys detentus
            - Eosteiromys homogenidens
        - - Dasyproctidae
            Dasyprocta azarae
          - Node A
            - - Eoviscaccia frassinettii
              - Eoviscaccia boliviana
              - Garridomys curunuquem
            - - Incamys bolivianus
              - - - Asteromys bolivianus
                  - Asteromys punctus
                - - - Cephalomyidae
                      - Cephalomys ceciae
                      - Cephalomyopsis hypselodontus
                      - Litodontomys chubutensis
                      - Cephalomys arcidens
                  - - Scotamys antiquus
                    - - - Neoepiblemidae
                          Perimys intermedius
                        - Chinchillidae
                          - Lagostomus maximus
                          - - Lagidium viscacia
                            - Chinchilla chinchilla
                      - Node B
                        - - Banderomys leanzai
                          - - Soriamys ganganensis
                            - Soriamys gaimanensis
                        - - Luantus propheticus
                          - - Guiomys unica
                            - - Microcavia australis
                              - - Cavia aperea
                                - - Galea musteloides
                                  - Dolichotis patagonum
