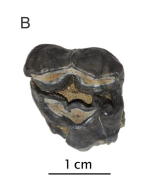
- Left m1 and m2 of Perimys sp.

Scientific classification
- Kingdom: Animalia
- Phylum: Chordata
- Class: Mammalia
- Order: Rodentia
- Family: †Neoepiblemidae
- Genus: †Perimys; Ameghino, 1887

Type species
- †Perimys erutus Ameghino, 1887

Species
- P. ameghinoi Scott 1905; P. dissimilis Ameghino 1902; P. erutus Ameghino 1887; P. impactus Ameghino 1894; P. incavatus Ameghino 1902; P. incurvus Ameghino 1902; P. intermedius Kramarz 2002; P. oemulus Ameghino 1894; P. onustus Ameghino 1887; P. pacificus Ameghino 1894; P. perpinguis Ameghino 1891; P. planaris Ameghino 1891; P. puellus Ameghino 1891; P. pueraster Ameghino 1891; P. scalabrinianus Ameghino 1889; P. transversus Ameghino 1902

Synonyms
- Sphodromys Ameghino 1887

= Perimys =

Perimys Temporal range: Early-Late Miocene (Colhuehuapian-Huayquerian) ~21.0–6.8 Ma

Extinct genus of rodents

Perimys is an extinct genus of neoepiblemid rodent that lived from the Early to Late Miocene in what is now South America. Fossils have been found in the Cerro Bandera, Cerro Boleadoras, Ituzaingó, Santa Cruz, and Sarmiento Formations of Argentina, and the Galera, Santa Cruz, and Río Frías Formations of Chile.

== Description ==
Perimys was a medium to large-sized rodent. Perimys can be distinguished from other caviomorphs in having euhypsodont and bilophodont cheek teeth, with the hypoflexus/id being conspicuously broader and filled with more cementum than in Prolagostomus and Pliolagostomus. As a result, the teeth of Perimys have a U-shape occlusal outline.

The malleoincudal complex of Perimys indicates its head was elongated, but not to the same extent as in chinchillines. As in chinchillids, however, the incudal long process of Perimys is more prolonged by a slight amount than the short process.

== Taxonomy ==
Perimys was first described by Florentino Ameghino in 1887 based on remains found in the Santa Cruz Formation of Argentina, with the proposed type species being Perimys erutus. Several other species have been described as pertaining to this genus. Ameghino originally assigned it to the obsolete family Eryomyidae, however, many later authors have assigned it to the Neoepiblemidae family.

The following cladogram of the Caviomorpha is based on Busker et al. 2020, showing the position of Perimys.

- - - Baluchimyinae
      Bugtimys zafarullahi
  - - - "Phiomorpha"
        - Phiomys andrewsi
        - Metaphiomys schaubi
    - - - Octodontoidea
          - Prospaniomys priscus
          - - Myocastor coypus
            - - - Echimyidae
                  - Proechimys polioplus
                  - - Eumysops laeviplicatus
                    - - Kannabateomys amblyonyx
                      - Echimys chrysurus
              - - - Ctenomyidae
                    Ctenomys australis
                - - - Plataeomys brevis
                    - Pithanotomys columnaris
                  - - Octomys mimax
                    - - Octodontomys gliroides
                      - - Chasichimys bonaerense
                        - Chasicomys octodontiforme
                        - - Acarechimys leucotheae
                          - Acarechimys minutus
                          - Acaremyidae
                            - Acaremys murinus
                            - Galileomys antelucanus
                            - Galileomys baios
      - - - Erethizontoidea
            - Steiromys detentus
            - Eosteiromys homogenidens
        - - Dasyproctidae
            Dasyprocta azarae
          - Node A
            - - Eoviscaccia frassinettii
              - Eoviscaccia boliviana
              - Garridomys curunuquem
            - - Incamys bolivianus
              - - - Asteromys bolivianus
                  - Asteromys punctus
                - - - Cephalomyidae
                      - Cephalomys ceciae
                      - Cephalomyopsis hypselodontus
                      - Litodontomys chubutensis
                      - Cephalomys arcidens
                  - - Scotamys antiquus
                    - - - Neoepiblemidae
                          Perimys intermedius
                        - Chinchillidae
                          - Lagostomus maximus
                          - - Lagidium viscacia
                            - Chinchilla chinchilla
                      - Node B
                        - - Banderomys leanzai
                          - - Soriamys ganganensis
                            - Soriamys gaimanensis
                        - - Luantus propheticus
                          - - Guiomys unica
                            - - Microcavia australis
                              - - Cavia aperea
                                - - Galea musteloides
                                  - Dolichotis patagonum

== Palaeobiology ==
Functional analysis of its scapula, humerus, ulna, and radius suggests that Perimys would have been well adapted for fossoriality.
