= Incamys =

Incamys Temporal range: Late Oligocene (Deseadan) ~28.0–24.0 Ma

Scientific classification
- Kingdom: Animalia
- Phylum: Chordata
- Class: Mammalia
- Order: Rodentia
- Family: Chinchillidae
- Genus: †Incamys; Hoffstetter and Lavocat 1970

Type species
- †Incamys bolivianus Hoffstetter & Lavocat 1970

Species
- I. bolivianus Hoffstetter & Lavocat 1970; I. menniorum Vucetich et al. 2015

Synonyms
- I. pretiosus Lavocat 1976

Extinct genus of rodents

Incamys is an extinct genus of chinchillid rodent that lived during the Late Oligocene (Deseadan) in what is now South America. Fossils of this genus have been found in the Salla Formation of Bolivia and the Agua de la Piedra and Sarmiento Formations of Argentina. Research on endocasts suggest they were group living using call communication like modern chinchillas.

== Taxonomy ==
Incamys was first described by Hoffstetter and Lavocat, based on remains found in the Salla Formation of Bolivia, with the proposed type species being Incamys bolivianus, referring to the country it was found in. Later, in 1976, a new species was named, I. pretiosus, which was subsequently found to be a junior synonym of the type species. In 2015, Vucetich and colleagues described a new species of Incamys, I. menniorum, from the Sarmiento Formation of Chubut Province, Argentina.

The following cladogram of the Caviomorpha is based on Busker et al. 2020, showing the position of Incamys.

- - - Baluchimyinae
      Bugtimys zafarullahi
  - - - "Phiomorpha"
        - Phiomys andrewsi
        - Metaphiomys schaubi
    - - - Octodontoidea
          - Prospaniomys priscus
          - - Myocastor coypus
            - - - Echimyidae
                  - Proechimys polioplus
                  - - Eumysops laeviplicatus
                    - - Kannabaetomys amblyonyx
                      - Echimys chrysurus
              - - - Ctenomyidae
                    Ctenomys australis
                - - - Plataeomys brevis
                    - Pithanotomys columnaris
                  - - Octomys mimax
                    - - Octodontomys gliroides
                      - - Chasichimys bonaerense
                        - Chasicomys octodontiforme
                        - - Acarechimys leucotheae
                          - Acarechimys minutus
                          - Acaremyidae
                            - Acaremys murinus
                            - Galileomys antelucanus
                            - Galileomys baios
      - - - Erethizontoidea
            - Steiromys detentus
            - Eosteiromys homogenidens
        - - Dasyproctidae
            Dasyprocta azarae
          - Node A
            - - Eoviscaccia frassinettii
              - Eoviscaccia boliviana
              - Garridomys curunuquem
            - - Incamys bolivianus
              - - - Asteromys bolivianus
                  - Asteromys punctus
                - - - Cephalomyidae
                      - Cephalomys ceciae
                      - Cephalomyopsis hypselodontus
                      - Litodontomys chubutensis
                      - Cephalomys arcidens
                  - - Scotamys antiquus
                    - - - Neoepiblemidae
                          Perimys intermedius
                        - Chinchillidae
                          - Lagostomus maximus
                          - - Lagidium viscacia
                            - Chinchilla chinchilla
                      - Node B
                        - - Banderomys leanzai
                          - - Soriamys ganganensis
                            - Soriamys gaimanensis
                        - - Luantus propheticus
                          - - Guiomys unica
                            - - Microcavia australis
                              - - Cavia aperea
                                - - Galea musteloides
                                  - Dolichotis patagonum

== Brain endocasts ==
Research on 30 million-year-old Incamys bolivianus virtual endocasts show they had expanded temporal lobes in the cerebrum and large caudal colliculi in the midbrain, arguing they had enhanced auditory acuity and vocalization. This is consistent with them living in social groups and using calls to communicate with each other, similar to modern chinchillas.
