= Elmerriggsia =

Elmerriggsia Temporal range: Late Oligocene (Deseadan) ~28–25 Ma

Scientific classification
- Kingdom: Animalia
- Phylum: Chordata
- Class: Mammalia
- Infraclass: Placentalia
- Order: †Notoungulata
- Family: †Leontiniidae
- Genus: †Elmerriggsia; Shockey, Flynn, Croft, Gans & Wyss 2012
- Species: †E. fieldia

Binomial name
- †Elmerriggsia fieldia Shockey, Flynn, Croft, Gans & Wyss, 2012

Extinct genus of mammals

Elmerriggsia is an extinct genus of Notoungulate, belonging to the family Leontiniidae. It lived during the Late Oligocene in South America.

== Description ==
This animal, like all leontiniids, had a fairly robust body and strong legs. Unlike most of its relatives, however, Elmerriggsia was less than 1,5 meters long. Elmerriggsia had the V-shaped skull when viewed from above, the canine-shaped upper incisors (as well as the third lower incisor), and the mesodont typed dentition characteristic of all leontiniids.

The skull of Elmerriggsia was characterized by the presence of premolars with a grooved protocone, without an intermediate lingual cingulum, and by a well developed labial cingulum on the lower molars. These dental features distinguished Elmerriggsia from any other leontiniids.

== Classification ==
Elmerriggsia fieldia was first described in 2012, based on fossil remains found near Pico Truncado in the Santa Cruz Province of Argentina, in terrains dated from the Deseadan (Late Oligocene). The fossils had been discovered over 75 years earlier, during an expedition to Argentina organized in 1924 by the Field Museum and led by Elmer S. Riggs, and were informally known as Leontinia sp.. Various fossils attributed to this animal were not only discovered near Pico Truncado, but also in various other areas of Argentina.

Elmerriggsia was a rather basal leontiniid, despite its Late Oligocene age; according to a cladistic analysis carried out in 2012, Elmerriggsia was part of a basal clade of leontiniids, shared with the Eocene genera Martinmiguelia and Coquenia.

== Bibliography ==
- B. J. Shockey, J. J. Flynn, D. A. Croft, P. Gans, and A. R. Wyss. 2012. New leontiniid Notoungulata (Mammalia) from Chile and Argentina: comparative anatomy, character analysis, and phylogenetic hypotheses. American Museum Novitates 3737:1-64
