= Hegetotheriopsis =

Hegetotheriopsis Temporal range: Late Oligocene-Early Miocene (Deseadan-Colhuehuapian) ~27–20 Ma

Scientific classification
- Kingdom: Animalia
- Phylum: Chordata
- Class: Mammalia
- Order: †Notoungulata
- Family: †Hegetotheriidae
- Subfamily: †Hegetotheriinae
- Genus: †Hegetotheriopsis; Kramarz & Paz 2013

Type species
- Hegetotheriopsis sulcatus Kramarz & Paz 2013

Extinct genus of notoungulates

Hegetotheriopsis is an extinct genus of hegetotheriid notoungulate. It lived from the Late Oligocene to the Early Miocene, and its fossilized remains are found in Argentina.

== Description ==
This genus is poorly known due to the fragmentary nature of its fossils; a comparison with some of its better-known relatives tends to indicate that it was roughly the size of a modern agouti. Hegetotheriopsis is defined by the presence of both archaic and derived characteristics. It had very high-crowned and open-rooted (euhypsodont) molars, with cementum and devoid of dimple in the adult dentition. The center of the lingual wall of the upper molars featured a small groove, less marked than in several of its relatives such as Prosotherium and Propachyrucos. The first upper premolar was devoid of lingual sulcus, while the third and fourth upper premolars were molariform. A vestigial parastilar groove was located on the second and third upper premolars. The anteorbital margin was devoid of zygomatic plate.

== Classification ==
Hegetotheriopsis sulcatus was first described in 2013, based on fossil remains found in the Chubut Province of Argentine Patagonia, in terrains dated from the Early Miocene. Other remains, found in the Cabeza Blanca locality of the Sarmiento Formation and attributed to the same species, are dated from the Late Oligocene. Furthermore, fossils of this genus have also been found in the Agua de la Piedra, Cerro Bandera, and Chichinales Formations of Mendoza, Neuquén, and Río Negro Provinces of Argentina. Hegetotheriopsis is a member of the family Hegetotheriidae, a group of small-sized Notoungulates, roughly similar to lagomorphs or rodents. The real affinities of the genus are not clear, and the descriptors, Kramarz and Paz, noted some archaic characteristics, excluding it from the two subfamily of hegetotheriids (Hegetotheriinae and Pachyrukhinae) and also found in the family Archaeohyracidae, usually considered ancestral to the family. Subsequent studies have instead recovered Hegetotheriopsis as a specialized hegetotheriid, attributed to the subfamily Hegetotheriinae.
