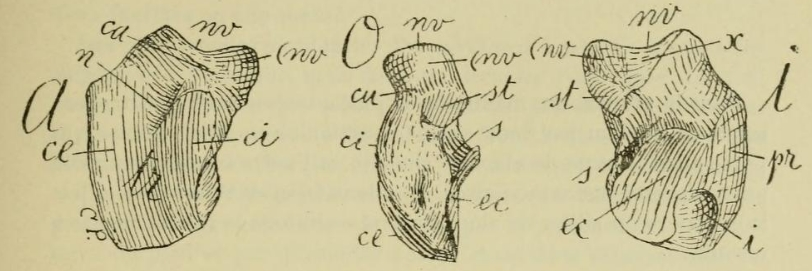
- Talus bone of Proplatyarthrus

Scientific classification
- Kingdom: Animalia
- Phylum: Chordata
- Class: Mammalia
- Infraclass: Placentalia
- Order: Pilosa
- Suborder: Folivora
- Family: †Megalonychidae
- Genus: †Proplatyarthrus; Ameghino 1905

Type species
- †P. longipes Ameghino, 1905

= Proplatyarthrus =

Proplatyarthrus Temporal range: Early Oligocene (Tinguirirican-Deseadan) ~33.9–28.4 Ma

Extinct ground sloth from Chubut, Argentina

Proplatyarthrus is an extinct genus of ground sloths of the family Megalonychidae, endemic to the Sarmiento Formation of the Chubut Province, Argentina.

== Taxonomy ==
Proplatyarthrus was named and a talus bone described by Florentino Ameghino in 1905. It was assigned to Megalonychidae by Carroll in 1988.

== Bibliography ==
- Ameghino, Florentino (1905), "La faceta articular inferior única del astrágalo de algunos mamíferos no es un carácter primitivo", Anales del Museo Nacional de Buenos Aires, 12: 1–64
