= Cerro Bandera Formation =

Geologic formation in Neuquén Province, Argentina

- Stratigraphic range: Aquitanian-Burdigalian (Colhuehuapian); ~21.0–17.5 Ma
- Underlies: Collón Curá Formation
- Overlies: Neuquén Group

Lithology
- Primary: Sandstone, mudstone
- Other: Limestone

Location
- Region: Neuquén Province
- Country: Argentina
- Extent: Neuquén Basin

Type section
- Named by: Leanza and Hugo
- Year defined: 1997
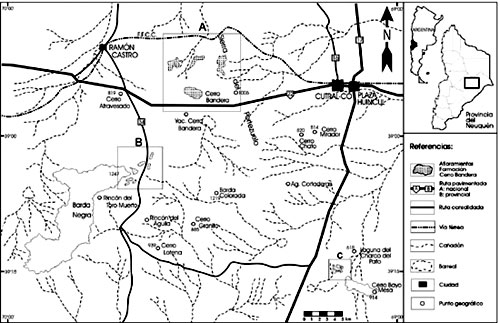

The Cerro Bandera Formation is a geological formation in Neuquén Province, Argentina, in northern Patagonia, which dates to the Early Miocene, around 21 to 17.5 million years ago. It predominantly consists of pyroclastic deposits, which were deposited in a semi-arid environment. It is divided up into a number of members. The diverse fauna of the Cerro Bandera Formation include a variety of turtles and birds, also includes many mammals such as South American native ungulates (notoungulates, litopterns, astrapotheres) as well as armadillos, and caviomorph rodents.

The Cerro Bandera Formation comprises a series of isolated outcrops that represent the relicts of an old alluvial filling developed on small local valleys. It is composed of a succession of reworked pyroclastic deposits alternating with primary pyroclastic and scant sandstone levels. These deposits were originally recognized at the northeast of Barda Negra, south of Cerro Bandera and northwest of Sierra del Portezuelo; new exposures are herein recognised to the northwestern slope of Cerro Bayo Mesa, Neuquén Province, Argentina. The recovered fossil remains correspond to birds of the family Falconidae and 17 families of mammals, among which are remarkable Cramauchenia, Proadinotherium, Eosteiromys, and Caviocricetus, plus a species of Protypotherium with more primitive dentition than those known from the Santacrucian SALMA. This association confirms a Colhuehuapian SALMA (Early Miocene) for this unit. This fauna is markedly different from that recorded from the lower section of the Chichinales Formation, Río Negro Province. The degree of faunistic differentiation between these probably synchronous units could be a result of local palaeoenvironmental differences.

The fossiliferous localities of the Cerro Bandera Formation are latitudinally equivalent to that of the Chichinales Formation. However, there are marked differences between their known faunal compositions. The only genera shared by both units are Cladosictis, Cramauchenia, Proeutatus, Protypotherium, and Stenotatus. To this must be added the recent discovery of remains of Eoviscaccia in the Chichinales Formation. In this unit the remains of turtles, hegetotheriid and leontiniid notoungulates are extremely abundant; while that in the Cerro Bandera Formation there are still no known remains of turtles, the interatheriids predominate over the hegetotheriids and the large herbivorous ungulates are mostly represented by the astrapotheres. In addition, the presence of at least two new genera only known from the Cerro Bandera Formation belonging to the families Astrapotheriidae and Cephalomyidae, infers a certain degree of faunal differentiation with respect not only to the Chichinales Formation, but also to the typical Colhuehuapian localities of the central Patagonia.

== Stratigraphy ==
The Cerro Bandera Formation occurs as a succession of small isolated whitish to yellowish-brown outcrops, aligned along ancient depressions and paleo-valleys carved in Late Cretaceous and Paleocene sediments. In the study area, the deposits of this unit overlie in erosive discordance several units of the Neuquén Group, including the Huincul, Cerro Lisandro and Portezuelo Formations, from the Late Cretaceous, as well as over Danian marine sediments of the Roca Formation in the Malargüe Group.

The known fossiliferous deposits in the Cerro Bandera Formation consist of isolated concentrations of fossil remains partially exposed on the surface due to the effect of rainwater and wind action. In general, fossil remains tend to be found in greater abundance in those sectors where the sequence is less altered. Possibly, the same factors that contributed to the alteration and devitrification of the pyroclastites also influenced the degradation of the bone materials. In this sense, the dental pieces seem to be the most resistant, having been found in some cases parts of dental series in correct position within the sediment, although any bone remains were completely missing.

At the type locality of the Cerro Bandera Formation, the succession consists of dominantly chonitic (consolidated pyroclastic deposits of very fine grain size, less than 0.062 mm,) and tuffitic deposits. In this outcrop were found two fossiliferous horizons within were found within deposits corresponding to strongly pedoturbed tuffaceous chonites (paleosols). The lower fossiliferous horizon corresponds to the basal deposits of this unit, where remains of small vertebrates were found together with freshwater gastropods.

On the northeastern slope of Barda Negra, the Cerro Bandera Formation exhibits a granocreccive sequence, with predominantly bentonitic (lacustrine) deposits at the base, gradually grading towards the top to deposits with higher epiclastic content (tuffites with sandy lenses), where fluvial sandstones with conglomeratic lenses bearing silicified logs dominate. In this locality, the basal bentonite deposits are commercially exploited in several mining properties, from where some dental and bone remains have been extracted, together with inadequately preserved fossil logs.

In the locality of Sierra del Portezuelo Norte, the unit is formed by an alternation of tuffites, bentonite chonites and tuffaceous chonites. At least four fossiliferous horizons have been recognized at the same locality, of which only the third horizon, located approximately 21 m from the base of the profile, has contributed fossiliferous material significant enough for this analysis. This horizon is located in pedoturbed deposits of tuffaceous chonites, which contributed numerous mammal remains along with scarce, poorly preserved beetle nests.

Finally, a fourth fossiliferous locality has been found on the northwestern slope of Cerro Bayo Mesa, a site where the Cerro Bandera Formation had not been previously recognized. This unit occurs there as a dominantly chonitic and tuffitic succession of thin thickness, with a single fossiliferous horizon, located ca. 13 m from the base of the profile, in levels of pedogenized tuffaceous chonites.

== Paleofauna ==
=== Reptiles ===
==== Testudines ====
Name	Species	Material	Notes	Image
Testudines indet.	Currently undescribed			

=== Birds ===
Name	Species	Member	Material	Notes	Image
Falconidae indet.	Currently undescribed				

=== Mammals ===
==== Meridiungulates ====
Name	Species	Material	Notes	Image
Astrapothericulus	A. sp.		An astrapotheriid	
Comahuetherium	C. coccaorum		An astrapotheriid	
Cramauchenia	C. normalis		A cramaucheniine macraucheniid	
Hegetotheriopsis	H. sulcatus		A hegetotheriid notoungulate	
Hegetotherium	H. sp.		A hegetotheriid notoungulate	
Parastrapotherium	P. sp.		An astrapotheriid	
Proadinotherium	P. cf. muensteri		A toxodontid notoungulate	
Protypotherium	P. sinclairi		An interatheriid notoungulate	

==== Xenarthrans ====
Name	Species	Material	Notes	Image
Astegotheriini indet.	Currently undescribed			
Glyptodontinae indet.	Currently undescribed			
Proeutatus	P. sp.		A chlamyphorid armadillo	
Prozaedyus	P. sp.			
Stenotatus	S. sp.			

==== Rodents ====
Name	Species	Material	Notes	Image
Banderomys	B. leanzai		A cephalomyid	
Caviocricetus	C. lucasi			
Doryperimys	D. olsacheri		A neoepiblemid rodent	
Garridomys	C. curunuquem		A chinchilloid caviomorph rodent	
Eoviscaccia	E. australis		A chinchillid rodent	
Leucockephalos	L. maior		An octodontoid rodent	
Octodontoidea indet.	Currently undescribed			
Perimys	P. sp.		A neoepiblemid rodent	

==== Metatherians ====
Name	Species	Material	Notes	Image
Abderites	A. sp.		An abderitid paucituberculatan	
Borhyaenidae indet.	Currently undescribed			
Cladosictis	C. sp.		A hathliacynid sparassodont	
Hathliacynidae indet.	Currently undescribed			
Palaeothentes	P. sp.		A palaeothentid paucituberculatan	
Pitheculites	P. sp.		An abderitid paucituberculatan	
Sipalocyon	S. sp.		A hathliacynid sparassodont	
