= Anayatherium =

Anayatherium Temporal range: Late Oligocene (Deseadan) ~27–26 Ma

Scientific classification
- Kingdom: Animalia
- Phylum: Chordata
- Class: Mammalia
- Infraclass: Placentalia
- Order: †Notoungulata
- Family: †Leontiniidae
- Genus: †Anayatherium; Shockey 2005

Type species
- †Anayatherium ekecoa Shockey, 2005

Species
- A. ekecoa Shockey 2005; A. fortis Shockey 2005

Extinct genus of notoungulates

Anayatherium is an extinct genus of notoungulate belonging to the family Leontiniidae. It lived during the Late Oligocene, and its fossilized remains were discovered in South America.

== Description ==
It was a large-sized and heavy-shaped animal, that could reach the size of a cow. It may have reached a length of 2.5 meters; its skull was 45 centimeters long, and its weight may have exceeded 350 kilograms.

Anayatherium was characterized by a very short muzzle, compared to other leontiniids. The shortening of the muzzle was reflected in the dentition by the loss of one of the upper teeth, probably a canine. The first upper incisor was larger than the second, as in Scarrittia, while the third and fourth premolars had vertical lingual grooves, as in Leontinia. The second upper incisor was of a typical shape, unlike Leontinia in which it had instead the shape of a canine; in Anayatherium, the first incisor took the place of the canine. Unlike Scarrittia, the premolars had grooved protocones. The molars were low-crowned (brachydont), and only slightly high-crowned (hypsodont) on the lingual side.

== Classification ==
The genus Anayatherium was first described in 2015 by Shockey, based on fossils found in the Salla Formation of Bolivia, in terrains dated from the Late Oligocene. Two species were attributed to the genus, A. ekecoa, the type species, and A. fortis, mainly distinguished by their respective sizes.

Anayatherium was a leontiniid, a family of notoungulates typical of the Oligocene and Miocene, with heavy and large bodies. Anayatherium seems to have belonged to a clade including Colpodon, Ancylocoelus, and the two derived genera Leontinia and Scarrittia.

== Paleoecology ==
Like all leontiniids, Anayatherium was a heavy quadrupedal folivore. Fossils of Anayatherium are unusually rare for a leontiniid; leontiniids were usually common animals in their habitats. It is possible that the Salla Formation may not have been particularly suited environment for leontiniids during the Late Oligocene.

== Bibliography ==
- B. J. Shockey. 2005. New leontinidids (Class Mammalia, Order Notoungulata, Family Leontiniidae) from the Salla beds of Bolivia (Deseadan, Late Oligocene). Bulletin of the Florida Museum of Natural History 45(4):249-260
- B. J. Shockey, J. J. Flynn, D. A. Croft, P. Gans, and A. R. Wyss. 2012. New leontiniid Notoungulata (Mammalia) from Chile and Argentina: comparative anatomy, character analysis, and phylogenetic hypotheses. American Museum Novitates 3737:1-64
