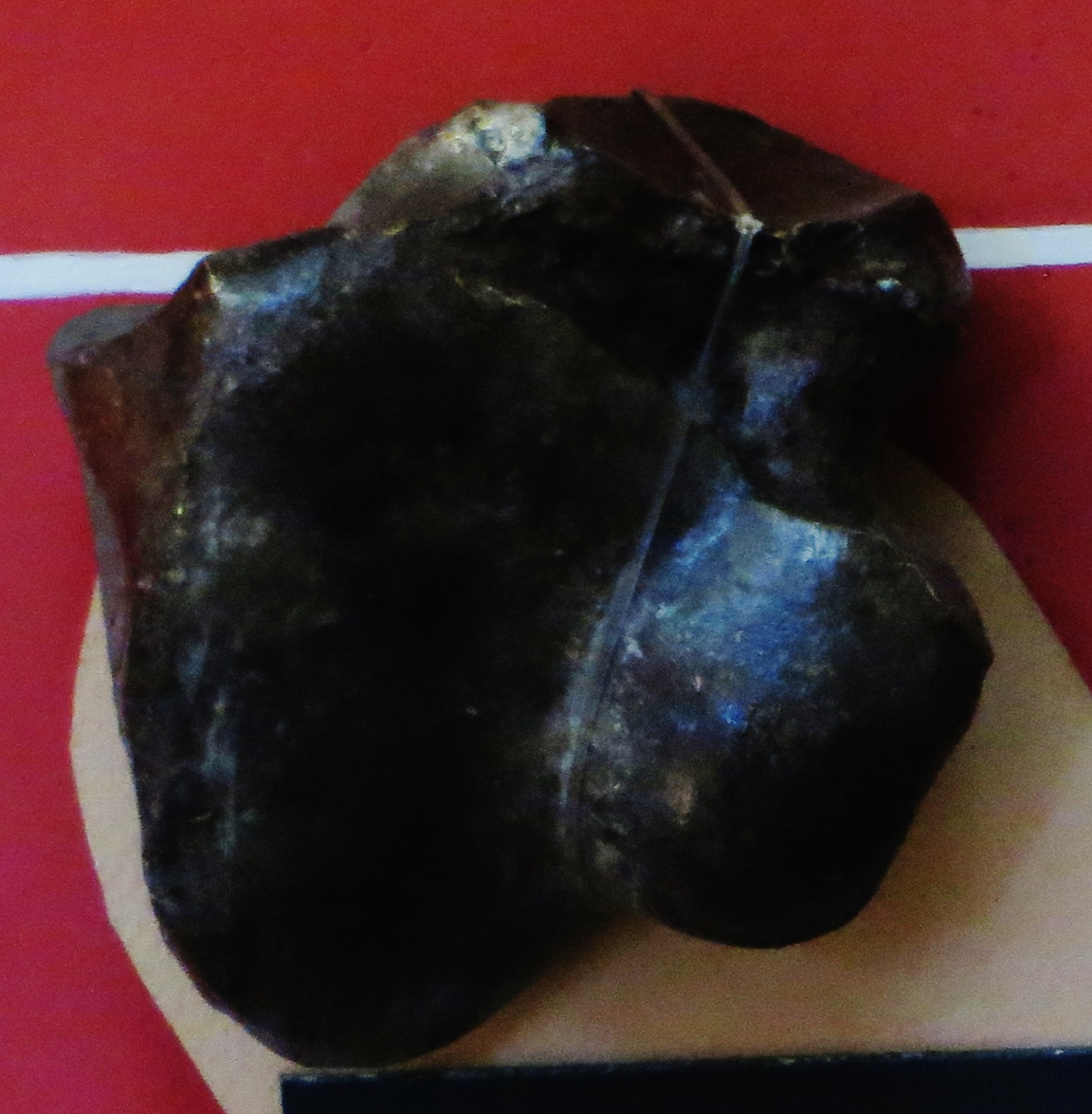
- Octodontotherium crassidens fossil

Scientific classification
- Kingdom: Animalia
- Phylum: Chordata
- Class: Mammalia
- Order: Pilosa
- Family: †Mylodontidae
- Genus: †Octodontotherium; Ameghino, 1894

Species
- O. crassidens; O. grandae

= Octodontotherium =

Octodontotherium Temporal range: Late Oligocene (Deseadan) ~29–23 Ma

Extinct genus of ground sloths

Octodontotherium (meaning "eight toothed beast") is an extinct genus of ground sloth of the family Mylodontidae, endemic to South America during the Late Oligocene (Deseadan). It lived from 29 to 23 Mya, existing for approximately 6 million years.

Fossil distribution is exclusive to Santa Cruz Province, Argentina (Deseado and Sarmiento Formations) and Bolivia (Salla Formation).

It was a large herbivore that fed on various types of plants.

== Taxonomy ==
Octodontotherium was named by Ameghino (1894). It was assigned to Mylodontidae by Carroll (1988); and to Mylodontinae by Gaudin (1995).

== Palaeoecology ==
Orthodentine microwear analysis suggests that Octodontotherium was an unspecialised herbivore able to feed on a variety of different plants.
