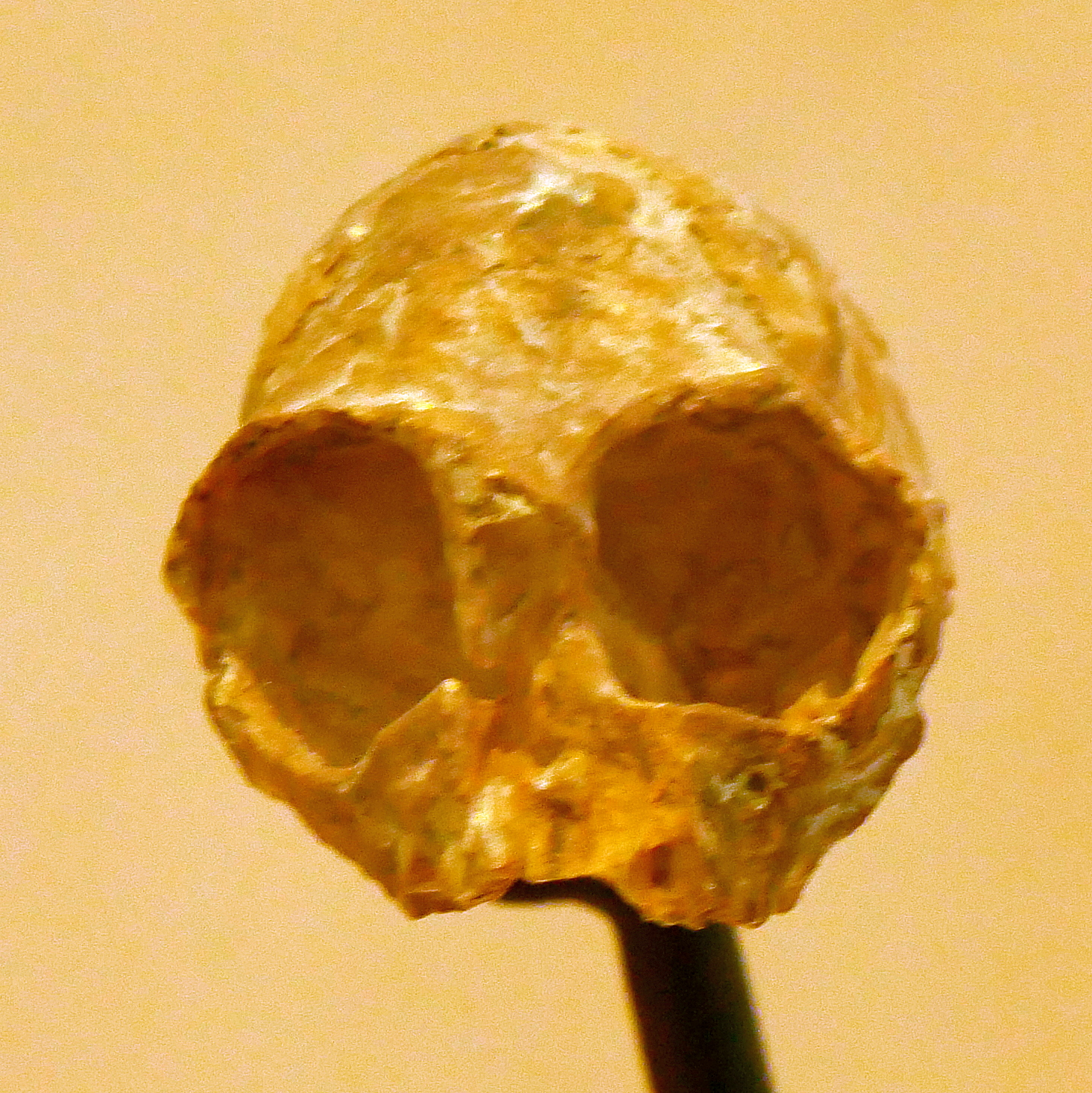
- Skull of Tremacebus harringtoni

Scientific classification
- Kingdom: Animalia
- Phylum: Chordata
- Class: Mammalia
- Order: Primates
- Suborder: Haplorhini
- Infraorder: Simiiformes
- Family: Aotidae
- Genus: †Tremacebus; Hershkovitz, 1974
- Species: †T. harringtoni

Binomial name
- †Tremacebus harringtoni (Rusconi, 1933)

= Tremacebus =

Tremacebus Temporal range: Early Miocene (Colhuehuapian) ~21.0–17.5 Ma

Extinct genus of new world monkeys

Tremacebus is an extinct genus of New World monkeys from the Early Miocene (Colhuehuapian in the SALMA classification). The type species is T. harringtoni.

== Description ==
Tremacebus was about 1 metre (3.3 ft) in length, and would have resembled a modern night monkey, to which it is thought to have been related. However, its eyes appear to have been smaller than the modern species. In addition, CT scans of the cranium suggest a relatively small olfactory bulb and poor sense of smell compared with night monkeys. These features suggest that it may not have been nocturnal. It had an estimated body mass of 1.8 kg (4.0 lb).

Only a few fossils have been found, including a skull from the Sarmiento Formation, Patagonia.
