= Cruschedula =

Cruschedula Temporal range: Oligocene (Tinguirirican-Deseadan)

Scientific classification
- Kingdom: Animalia
- Phylum: Chordata
- Class: Aves
- Order: Pelecaniformes
- Suborder: †Cladornithes
- Family: †Cladornithidae
- Genus: †Cruschedula; Ameghino, 1899
- Species: †C. revola

Binomial name
- †Cruschedula revola Ameghino, 1899

Extinct genus of birds

Cruschedula is an enigmatic bird genus considered to be nomen dubium which consists of the single species Cruschedula revola.

== Description ==
The genus was first described by Florentino Ameghino in his 1899 volume Sinopsis geológico-paleontológica. Suplemento. (Adiciones y correcciones.). The name was coined by Ameghino from a combination of the crus meaning "shin" and schedula meaning "a small sheet of paper". The etymology of the specific epithet is not clear, but possibly from the revolare. The genus and species were described from a single partial bone which Ameghino considered to be a tarsometatarsus section. The bone was found in Oligocene (Tinguirirican to Deseadan) beds of the Deseado Formation near San Jorge Gulf in Southern Patagonia. Designated the holotype specimen, it was added to the Bernardino Rivadavia Natural Sciences Museum along with a large portion of Ameghino's fossil collections.

== Taxonomy ==
In his paper, Ameghino erected the family Cruschedulidae, however in his 1906 paper "Enumeracion de los Impennes Fosiles de Patagonia y de la Isla Seymour" he synonymized the family into Cladornithidae. When described Ameghino envisioned the genus and the family Cladornithidae as a whole to have represented a group of extinct "dry-land" penguins. This was because the fossil, having been collected from an outcrop of the Deseado Formation, was thought to be similar to other penguin fossils Ameghino attributed to the same formation. The Deseado Formation preserved a terrestrial environment, and thus the presence of penguins was considered highly unusual.

The placement of Cruschedula as a penguin was not challenged until 1946 by eminent paleontologist George Gaylord Simpson. After examining the holotype, Simpson concluded there were no distinguishable details that defined the bone as from a penguin, but did not have any opinion as to what bird group it may have belonged to. The fossil was again restudied in 1964 by Pierce Brodkorb, who asserted the fossil to not be a tarsometatarsus but rather the end of a scapula. In his Catalogue of Fossil Birds Brodkorb placed the genus into the diurnal bird of prey family Accipitridae. This placement was followed by Simpson in his 1972 Conspectus of Patagonian fossil penguins However, the placement was rejected by Eduardo P. Tonni in his 1980 paper The present state of knowledge of the Cenozoic birds of Argentina where he considered the bone fragment upon which the genus was erected to be undiagnostic. This assessment was supported by Storrs L. Olson in 1985, who quoted Tonni's assessment of the Cruschedula holotype as undiagnostic.
