= Fray Bentos Formation =

Geologic formation in Uruguay

- Stratigraphic range: Deseadan (Middle Oligocene - Early Miocene); ~29.0–21.0 Ma
- Type: Geological formation
- Unit of: Paysandú Group
- Underlies: Raigón Formation
- Overlies: Asencio Formation

Lithology
- Primary: sandstone
- Other: siltstone

Location
- Country: Uruguay, Argentina
- Extent: Paraná Basin

Type section
- Named for: Fray Bentos
- Named by: Bossi
- Year defined: 1966
- Fray Bentos Formation, Uruguay

The Fray Bentos Formation is a Deseadan geologic formation of the Paysandú Group in Uruguay and portions of Argentina, corresponding to the Paraná Basin. It is composed of calcareous sandstones and siltstones with a pinkish-orange coloration. It outcrops in southwestern Uruguay (Canelones and Soriano Departments), the central and southeastern part of the province of Corrientes and northeast Entre Ríos.

== Fossil content ==
The following fossils have been reported from the formation:

Mammals

Taxa	Species	Presence	Abundance	Description	Images
Argyrohyrax	A. proavus			An interatheriid	Scarrittia
Cephalomyidae					Scarrittia
Eopachyrucos	E. ranchoverdensis			An interatheriid	Scarrittia
Fiandraia	F. romeii			A notogulate of uncertain lineage	Scarrittia
Proborhyaena	P. gigantea			A sparassodont	Scarrittia
Oligopterna	O. orientalis			A proterotheriid litoptern	Scarrittia
Prohegetotherium	P. schiaffinoi			A hegetotheriidae notoungulate	Scarrittia
Protypotherium	P. sp				Scarrittia
Scarrittia	S. robusta			A leontiniid	Scarrittia
Urotherium	U. interundatum			A dubious glyptodont	Scarrittia
Uruguaytherium	U. beaulieui		A fragmentary specimen	An astrapotherian mammal	Scarrittia

Birds

Taxa	Species	Presence	Abundance	Description	Images
Devincenzia	D. gallinali			A phorusrhacid	
Devincenzia	D. pozzi			A phorusrhacid	

== See also ==
- List of fossiliferous stratigraphic units in Uruguay

== Bibliography ==
- D. Perea, P. Toriño, and M. R. Ciancio. 2014. La presencia del Xenartro Palaeopeltis inornatus Ameghino, 1894, en la Formación Fray Bentos (Oligoceno Tardío), Uruguay. Ameghiniana 51(3):254-258
- M. Ubilla, D. Perea, and M. Bond. 1994. The Deseadan Land Mammal Age in Uruguay and the report of Scarrittia robusta nov. sp. (Leontiniidae, Notoungulata) in the Fray Bentos Formation (Oligocene - ? Lower Miocene). Geobios 27(1):95-102
- Bond, Mariano; López, Guillermo; Reguero, Marcelo A.; Scillato Yané, Gustavo J.; Vucetich, María G. (1998), "Los mamíferos de la Formación Fray Bentos (Edad mamífero Deseadense, Oligoceno Superior) de las provincias de Corrientes y Entre Ríos, Argentina", Asociación Paleontológica Argentina. Publicación Especial, 5: 41–50
- Tófalo, Ofelia Rita; Morrás, Héctor J.M. (2009), "Evidencias paleoclimáticas en duricostras, paleosuelos y sedimentitas silicoclásticas, del Cenozoico de Uruguay" (PDF), Revista de la Asociación Geológica Argentina: 674–686
