= Australoprocta =

Australoprocta Temporal range: Early Miocene (Colhuehuapian) ~21.0–17.5 Ma

Scientific classification
- Kingdom: Animalia
- Phylum: Chordata
- Class: Mammalia
- Order: Rodentia
- Family: Dasyproctidae
- Genus: †Australoprocta; Kramarz, 1988
- Species: †A. fleaglei

Binomial name
- †Australoprocta fleaglei Kramarz 1998

Extinct genus of rodents

Australoprocta is an extinct genus of dasyproctid rodent that lived during the Early Miocene of what is now Argentina. Fossils of this genus have been found in the Chichinales and Sarmiento Formations of Argentina.
