= Dudumus =

Dudumus Temporal range: Early Miocene

Scientific classification
- Kingdom: Animalia
- Phylum: Chordata
- Class: Mammalia
- Infraclass: Placentalia
- Order: Rodentia
- Superfamily: Octodontoidea
- Genus: Dudumus; Arnal et al., 2014
- Species: D. ruigomezi

Binomial name
- Dudumus ruigomezi Arnal et al., 2014

Extinct genus of rodents

Dudumus is an extinct genus of octodontoid rodent that lived during the Early Miocene.

== Distribution ==
Dudumus ruigomezi fossil remains are known from the Trelew Member of the Sarmiento Formation of Argentina.
