= Moquegua Basin =

Peruvian sedimentary basin

- Cuenca Moquegua
- Location within Peru
- Coordinates: 16°48′S 70°48′W
- Etymology: City of Moquegua, Peru
- Location: Western South America
- Country: Peru
- State: Department of Moquegua
- Cities: Moquegua

Characteristics
- On/Offshore: Onshore
- Part of: Circum-Pacific forearc basins

Hydrology
- Sea: Eastern Pacific Ocean
- River: Osmore River

Geology
- Basin type: Forearc basin
- Orogeny: Andean
- Age: Cenozoic

Moquegua Basin is a sedimentary basin in southernmost Peru. Sedimentary rocks of the basin, including those of Moquegua Group, crop out in the Central Depression makes up part of the sedimentary fill of the basin. The basement of the basin is made of rocks older than the Cenozoic.

Despite being close to the Pacific Ocean Moquegua Basin appear to have been unaffected by the Oligo-Miocene marine transgression that affected many other basins of western South America such as nearby Pisco Basin. Concurrent with Andean uplift it is thought that the basin went from having a “balanced basin-fill” between Oligocene and Middle Miocene having a “overfilled basin-fill” from the Middle Miocene to the present.
