= Sallatherium =

Sallatherium Temporal range: Late Oligocene ~27–25 Ma

Scientific classification
- Domain: Eukaryota
- Kingdom: Animalia
- Phylum: Chordata
- Class: Mammalia
- Order: †Notoungulata
- Family: †Hegetotheriidae
- Subfamily: †Hegetotheriinae
- Genus: †Sallatherium; Reguero & Cerdeno, 2005

Type species
- Sallatherium altiplanense Reguero & Cerdeno, 2005

Extinct genus of notoungulates

Sallatherium is an extinct genus of Notoungulate, belonging to the suborder Typotheria. It lived during the Late Oligocene, and its fossilized remains were discovered in South America.

== Description ==
This animal was roughly the size of a modern hare, while its appearance was probably more similar to that of a pika. Compared to its smaller relative Prohegetotherium, Sallatherium had extremely elongated and thin nasal bones, upper jugal teeth with a labial groove placed more medially, and a much narrower mandibular symphysis. Its snout was generally narrower and elongated. The second and third incisors and the upper canine were smaller than in Prohegetotherium, and there was a diastema between the third lower incisor and the lower canine.

== Classification ==
Sallatherium altiplanense was first described in 2005, based on fossil remains from the Salla Formation in Bolivia. Another smaller and more widespread hegetotheriid, Prohegetotherium schiaffinoi, was discovered in the same deposits.

Sallatherium was a member of the family Hegetotheriidae, a group of small-sized, lagomorph-like notoungulates. The dentition of this animal tends to indicate that it was related to Prohegetotherium and Hegetotherium, within the subfamily Hegetotheriinae.

== Bibliography ==
- Reguero, M. & Cerdeno E. (2005): New Late Oligocene Hegetotheriidae (Mammalia, Notoungulata) from Salla, Bolivia. – Journal of Vertebrate Paleontology, 25: 674-684.
- F. D. Seoane, S. R. Juñent, and E. Cerdeño. 2017. Phylogeny and paleobiogeography of Hegetotheriidae (Mammalia, Notoungulata). Journal of Vertebrate Paleontology 37(1):e1278547:1-13
