= Doryperimys =

Doryperimys Temporal range: Early Miocene

Scientific classification
- Kingdom: Animalia
- Phylum: Chordata
- Class: Mammalia
- Infraclass: Placentalia
- Order: Rodentia
- Family: †Neoepiblemidae
- Genus: †Doryperimys; Kramarz et al., 2015
- Species: †D. olsacheri

Binomial name
- †Doryperimys olsacheri Kramarz et al., 2015

Extinct genus of rodents

Doryperimys is an extinct genus of neoepiblemid rodent that lived during the Early Miocene.

== Distribution ==
Doryperimys olsacheri is known from the Cerro Bandera Formation of Argentina.
