= Changquin =

Changquin Temporal range: Late Oligocene

Scientific classification
- Kingdom: Animalia
- Phylum: Chordata
- Class: Mammalia
- Infraclass: Placentalia
- Order: Rodentia
- Family: †Acaremyidae
- Genus: †Changquin; Vucetich et al., 2014
- Species: †C. woodi

Binomial name
- †Changquin woodi Vucetich et al., 2014

Extinct genus of acaremyid rodent

Changquin is an extinct genus of acaremyid rodent that lived in South America during the Chattian stage of the Oligocene epoch.

== Etymology ==
The generic name Changquin derives from the Mapuche word changquin, referring to the geographic area where the holotype was found. The specific epithet of the type species, Changquin woodi, honours the palaeontologist Albert E. Wood for his contributions to the study of Deseadan rodents in South America and for describing the first rodent fossils from Scarritt Pocket, the type locality of C. woodi.
