= Deuterotherium =

Deuterotherium Temporal range: Oligocene (Deseadan) ~29–21 Ma

Scientific classification
- Kingdom: Animalia
- Phylum: Chordata
- Class: Mammalia
- Order: †Notoungulata
- Family: †Notohippidae
- Genus: †Deuterotherium; Ameghino 1895
- Species: †D. distichum

Binomial name
- †Deuterotherium distichum Ameghino 1895

Extinct genus of mammals

Deuterotherium is an extinct genus of South American native ungulates, which lived during the Deseadan age of the Oligocene in what is now Argentina. Its type species is Deuterotherium distichum. It was named by Florentino Ameghino in 1895. The holotype of Deuterotherium distichum is a calcaneum. It was formerly identified as a proterotheriid litoptern. In 1999, Shockey argued Deuterotherium was certainly not a litoptern and interpreted it as a notohippid notoungulate. In research by Soria posthumously published in 2001, Soria considered Deuterotherium a nomen dubium.
