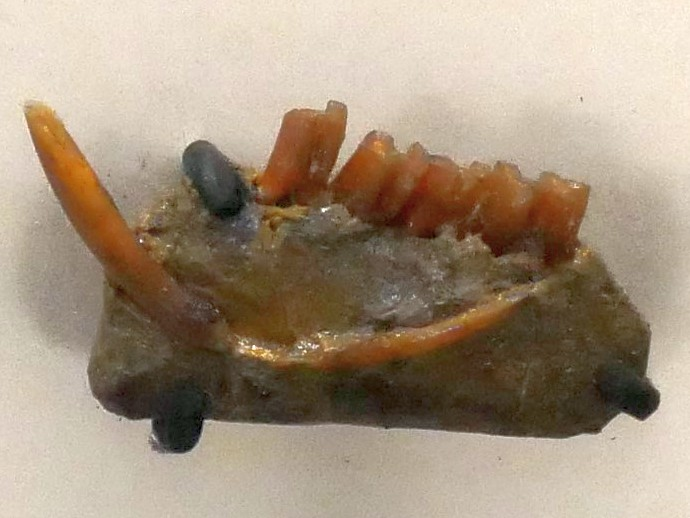
- Mandible of Cephalomys arcidens

Scientific classification
- Domain: Eukaryota
- Kingdom: Animalia
- Phylum: Chordata
- Class: Mammalia
- Order: Rodentia
- Infraorder: Hystricognathi
- Parvorder: Caviomorpha
- Superfamily: Cavioidea
- Family: †Cephalomyidae; Ameghino 1897

Genera
- †Banderomys; †Cephalomyopsis; †Cephalomys; †Litodontomys; †Soriamys

= Cephalomyidae =

Cephalomyidae Temporal range: Late Oligocene-Early Miocene (Deseadan-Colhuehuapian) ~21.0–17.5 Ma

Extinct family of rodents

Cephalomyidae is an extinct family of caviomorph rodents from South America. The specific relationships of the family are uncertain, and affinities to both chinchilloid and cavioid rodents have been supported. Most recently, Kramarz in 2005 performed a phylogenetic analysis supporting a relationship to the Cavioidea, as represented by Eocardiidae, although more recent analyses have placed them among the chinchilloids as relatives of the giant neoepiblemid rodents. McKenna and Bell (1997) questioned the validity of the family, placing the cephalomyid genera then known in Dasyproctidae, but Kramarz (2001) subsequently reasserted the distinctiveness of cephalomyids.

Fossils of the family have been found in Deseadan to Colhuehuapian Fray Bentos, Deseado, Cerro Bandera and Sarmiento Formations and the Colhué Huapí Member of Argentina and the Puca Group of Bolivia.
