= Coquenia =

Coquenia Temporal range: Early Eocene ~45–40 Ma

Scientific classification
- Kingdom: Animalia
- Phylum: Chordata
- Class: Mammalia
- Order: †Notoungulata
- Family: †Leontiniidae
- Genus: †Coquenia; Deraco, Powell & Lopez 2008
- Species: †C. bondi

Binomial name
- †Coquenia bondi Deraco, Powell & Lopez, 2008

Extinct genus of mammals

Coquenia is an extinct genus of Notoungulate, belonging to the family Leontiniidae. It lived during the Middle Eocene, in what is today Argentina.

== Description ==
Known only from skull and mandible remains, Coquenia may have been a heavily built animal, about the size of a sheep. This animal dentition was low-crowned (brachydont), and the incisors resembled canines, with labial and lingual cingulum. The second upper incisor was more developed than the two others, a typical characteristic of the Leontiniidae, while the upper canines had a rotated crown with labial and lingual cingulum. The four premolars had an anterolingual cingulum with a small basin directly in front of the protocone. The premolars progressively increased in size towards the back of the jaw. The upper molars had a labial cingulum, and a posterior dimple, like the lower molars. The third upper molar was wider at the base of its lingual side.

== Classification ==
Coquenia is a basal member of the family Leontiniidae, a group of toxodont Notoungulates that appeared during the Eocene and survived until the Miocene, with a robust body and massive legs. Coquenia was one of the earliest members of the family, along with its relative Martinmiguelia.

Coquenia bondi was first described in 2008, based on fossil remains from the Pampa Grande locality of the Lumbrera Formation, in the Salta Province of Argentina.

== Palaeobiology ==
=== Palaeoecology ===
The narrow muzzle of C. bondi suggests that it was a highly selective feeder, in contrast to taxa with wide muzzles such as Nesodon and Adinotherium.

== Bibliography ==
- M. V. Deraco, J. E. Powell, and G. Lopez. 2008. Primer leontínido (Mammalia, Notoungulata) de la Formación Lumbrera (Subgrupo Santa Bárbara, Grupo Salta-Paleógeno) del noroeste argentino. Ameghiniana 45(1):83-91
- J. E. Powell, M. J. Babot, D. A. García López, M. V. Deraco, and C. Herrera. 2011. Eocene vertebrates of northwest Argentina: annotated list. In J. Salfity, R. A. Marquillas (eds.), Cenozoic Geology of the Central Andes of Argentina 349–370
