= Arthrodytes =

Arthrodytes Temporal range: Late Eocene-Early Oligocene or Early Miocene ~23–16 Ma

Scientific classification
- Domain: Eukaryota
- Kingdom: Animalia
- Phylum: Chordata
- Class: Aves
- Order: Sphenisciformes
- Family: Spheniscidae
- Subfamily: †Paraptenodytinae
- Genus: †Arthrodytes; Ameghino 1905

Species
- A. andrewsi (type)

Extinct genus of birds

Arthrodytes is an extinct genus of penguins which contains a single species, whose remains have been recovered from the San Julian Formation (Late Eocene to Early Oligocene) of Patagonia. Other authors report a younger age for the fossils recovered from the Early Miocene Gaiman and Monte León Formations.

Together with the related genus Paraptenodytes, they form the subfamily Paraptenodytinae, which is not ancestral to modern penguins.
