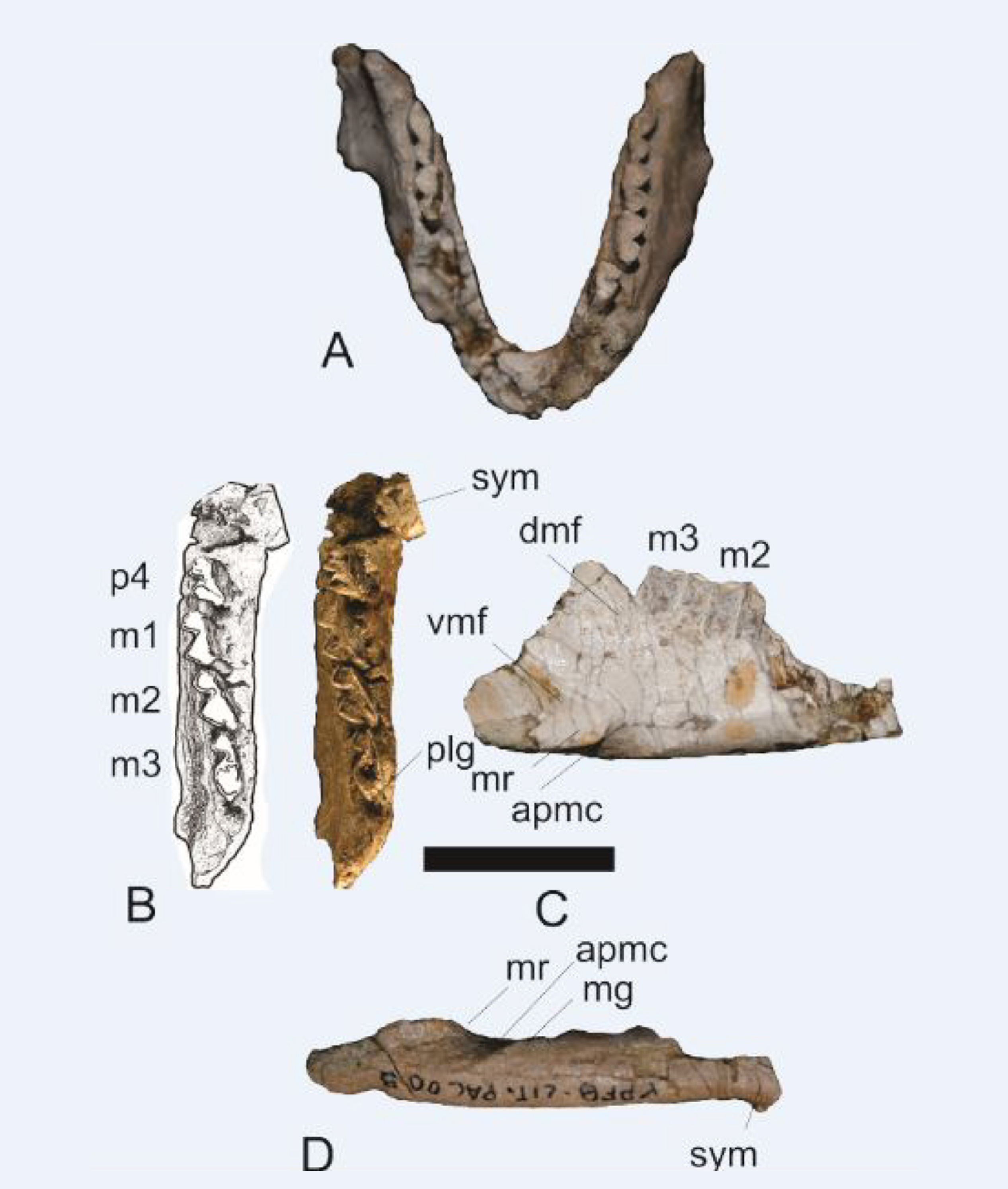
- Prohegetotherium fossilized lower mandibles.

Scientific classification
- Domain: Eukaryota
- Kingdom: Animalia
- Phylum: Chordata
- Class: Mammalia
- Order: †Notoungulata
- Family: †Hegetotheriidae
- Subfamily: †Hegetotheriinae
- Genus: †Prohegetotherium; Ameghino 1897

Species
- P. sculptum Ameghino 1897 (type)

Synonyms
- Ethegotherium? Minoprio, 1947

= Prohegetotherium =

Prohegetotherium Temporal range: Late Oligocene-Early Miocene (Deseadan-Santacrucian) ~29–16.5 Ma

Extinct genus of notoungulates

Prohegetotherium is an extinct genus of hegetotheriid notoungulates from the Late Oligocene to Early Miocene (Deseadan-Santacrucian in the SALMA classification) of the Agua de la Piedra, Mariño & Sarmiento Formations of Argentina, the Petaca and Salla Formations of Bolivia, and Fray Bentos Formation of Uruguay.

== Taxonomy ==
Prohegetotherium comprises three species, P. sculptum, P. schiaffinoi, and P. malalhuense. Although Prohegetotherium shumwayi and P. crassus have long been synonymized with P. sculptum, Kramarz and Bond (2017) restricted P. sculptum to the holotype, rejecting the synonymy.

== See also ==
- Ethegotherium
