= Ancylocoelus =

Ancylocoelus Temporal range: Late Oligocene ~29–23 Ma

Scientific classification
- Domain: Eukaryota
- Kingdom: Animalia
- Phylum: Chordata
- Class: Mammalia
- Order: †Notoungulata
- Family: †Leontiniidae
- Genus: †Ancylocoelus; Ameghino 1894

Type species
- †Ancylocoelus frequens Ameghino, 1894

Species
- A. frequens Ameghino 1894; A. lentus Ameghino 1901; A. minor Ameghino 1901

Synonyms
- Henricofilholia inaequilatera Ameghino 1901; Leontinia garzoni Ameghino 1894; Rodiotherium armatum Ameghino 1894

Extinct genus of mammals

Ancylocoelus is an extinct genus of mammal, belonging to the order Notoungulata. It lived during the Late Oligocene, in what is today Argentina, in South America.

== Description ==
This genus is only known from cranial remains, but comparison with some of its better-known relatives such as Leontinia indicates that it was an heavily shaped animal, vaguely similar to an hornless, smaller and slender rhinoceros. The skull was short and tall, with low-crowned (brachydont) premolars and molars. Ancylocoelus was approximately 1.70 meters long and 70 centimeters high at the withers. Compared to other, more basal forms, Ancylocoelus lacked both its upper and lower canines, and its first lower premolar.

== Classification ==
Ancylocoelus was first described in 1894 by Florentino Ameghino, based on fossil remains found in Argentina. The type species is Ancylocoelus frequens. A few years later Ameghino described two other species, A. lentus and A. minor.

Ancylocoelus was a member of the family Leontiniidae, a group of Notoungulates with heavy shapes, typical of the South American Oligocene. It was closely related to Leontina and Scarrittia.

== Bibliography ==
- F. Ameghino. 1894. Sur les oiseaux fossiles de Patagonie; et la faune mammalogique des couches à Pyrotherium. Boletin del Instituto Geographico Argentino 15:501-660
- F. Ameghino. 1897. Mamiferos Cretaceos de la Argentina. Segunda contribucion al conocimiento de la fauna mastologica de las capas con restos de Pyrotherium. Boletin Instituto Geografico Argentino 18:406-521
- F. Ameghino. 1901. Notices préliminaires sur des ongulés nouveaux des terrains crétacés de Patagonie [Preliminary notes on new ungulates from the Cretaceous terrains of Patagonia]. Boletin de la Academia Nacional de Ciencias de Córdoba 16:349-429
- B. J. Shockey. 2005. New leontinidids (Class Mammalia, Order Notoungulata, Family Leontiniidae) from the Salla beds of Bolivia (Deseadan, Late Oligocene). Bulletin of the Florida Museum of Natural History 45(4):249-260
- A. M. Ribeiro, G. M. López, and M. Bond. 2010. The Leontiniidae (Mammalia, Notoungulata) from the Sarmiento Formation at Gran Barranca, Chubut Province, Argentina. In R. H. Madden, A. A. Carlini, M. G. Vucetich, R. F. Kay (eds.), The Paleontology of Gran Barranca: Evolution and Environmental Change through the Middle Cenozoic of Patagonia 170–181
