= Neoepiblemidae =

Neoepiblemidae Temporal range: Early-Late Miocene (Colhuehuapian-Huayquerian) ~21.0–6.8 Ma

Scientific classification
- Domain: Eukaryota
- Kingdom: Animalia
- Phylum: Chordata
- Class: Mammalia
- Order: Rodentia
- Superfamily: Cavioidea
- Family: †Neoepiblemidae; Kraglievich 1926

Genera
- †Doryperimys; †Perimys; †Neoepiblema; †Phoberomys

Extinct family of rodents

The Neoepiblemidae are an extinct family of hystricognath rodents from South America. The genera Dabbenea and Perumys are now included in Phoberomys. The delineation between Neoepiblemidae and Dinomyidae has historically been unclear, with some genera (such as Phoberomys and Eusigmomys) having varying taxonomic placement. A 2017 study found Phoberomys to be part of the group, while Eusigmomys was found to be part of the Dinomyidae.

Fossils of the family were found in the Colhuehuapian to Huayquerian Pinturas, Sarmiento, Santa Cruz, Cerro Bandera and Ituzaingó Formations and Colhué Huapí Member of Argentina, the Solimões Formation of Brazil, the Pebas Formation of Peru and the Urumaco Formation of Venezuela.
