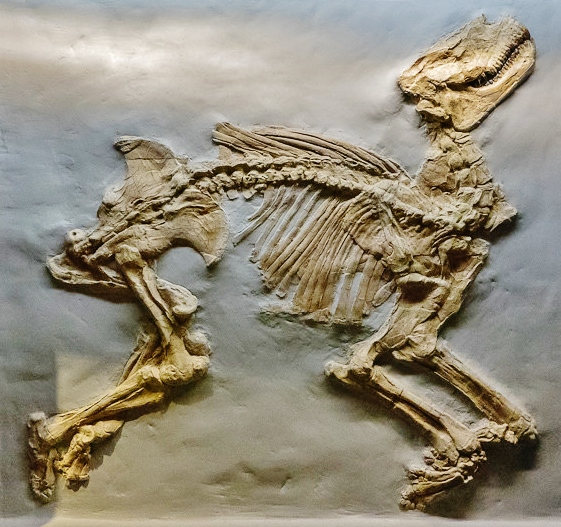
- S. canquelensis fossil

Scientific classification
- Kingdom: Animalia
- Phylum: Chordata
- Class: Mammalia
- Order: †Notoungulata
- Family: †Leontiniidae
- Genus: †Scarrittia; Simpson 1934

Type species
- †Scarrittia canquelensis Simpson 1934

Species
- S. barranquensis Ribeiro et al. 2010; S. canquelensis Simpson 1934; S. robusta Ubilla et al. 1994

= Scarrittia =

Scarrittia Temporal range: Late Oligocene (Deseadan) ~28.4–23.03 Ma

Extinct genus of notoungulates

Scarrittia is an extinct genus of hoofed mammal of the family Leontiniidae, native to South America during the Late Oligocene epoch (Deseadan in the SALMA classification).

== Description ==
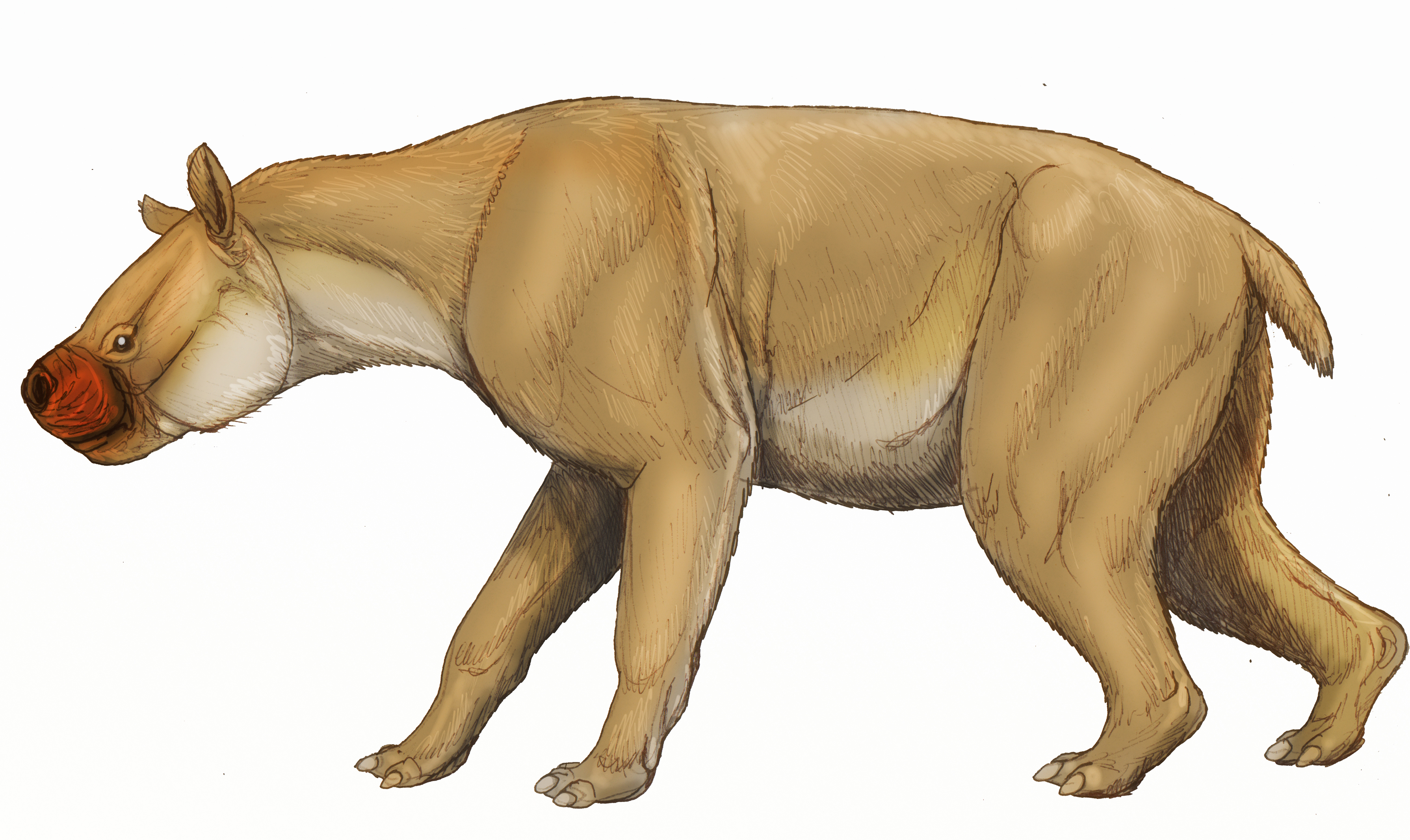
Restoration

Scarrittia was about 2 metres (6.6 ft) in body length, and resembled a rhinoceros with a relatively long body and neck. It had three hoofed toes on each foot, and a very short tail. Due to a fused tibia and fibula, Scarrittia would have been unable to turn its legs sideways. The short skull had 44 poorly specialized teeth.

== Natural history ==
This was a very successful genus with various known species, such as Scarrittia robusta, S. barranquensis and S. canquelensis, which lived around 30 million years ago. They lived in moist forest, near the coast, in wetlands, lakes, swamps, etc. and they ate soft vegetation, grasses, fruits and trees. Some species were omnivorous, eating also eggs and small mammals. They were not adapted for running, though their large size meant they had few enemies.

== Distribution ==
Fossils of Scarrittia have been found in:

- Sarmiento Formation, Argentina
- Fray Bentos Formation, Uruguay
