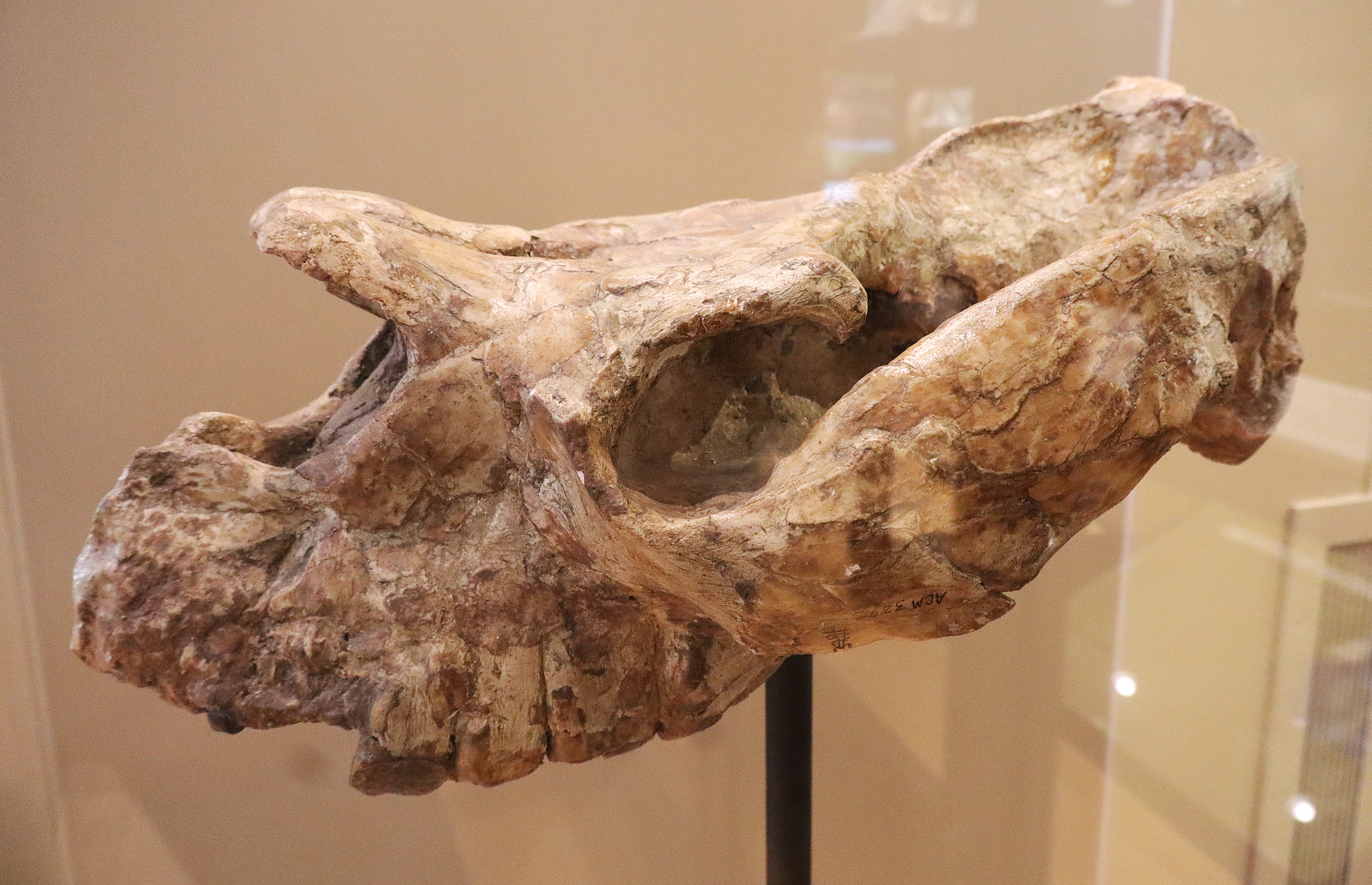
- Skull of L. gaudryi, Beneski Museum of Natural History

Scientific classification
- Kingdom: Animalia
- Phylum: Chordata
- Class: Mammalia
- Infraclass: Placentalia
- Order: †Notoungulata
- Family: †Leontiniidae
- Genus: †Leontinia; Ameghino 1895

Species
- L. gaudryi Ameghino 1895 (type); L. tertiaria Ameghino 1902

= Leontinia =

Leontinia Temporal range: Late Oligocene (Deseadan) ~28.4–23.03 Ma

Extinct genus of notoungulates

Leontinia is an extinct genus of leontiniid notoungulate. Fossils have been found in the Deseado and Sarmiento Formations in Argentina and Tremembé Formation of Brazil, and are the most abundant remains of any animal found there. The genus dates back to the Late Oligocene, Deseadan in the SALMA classification.

== Description ==
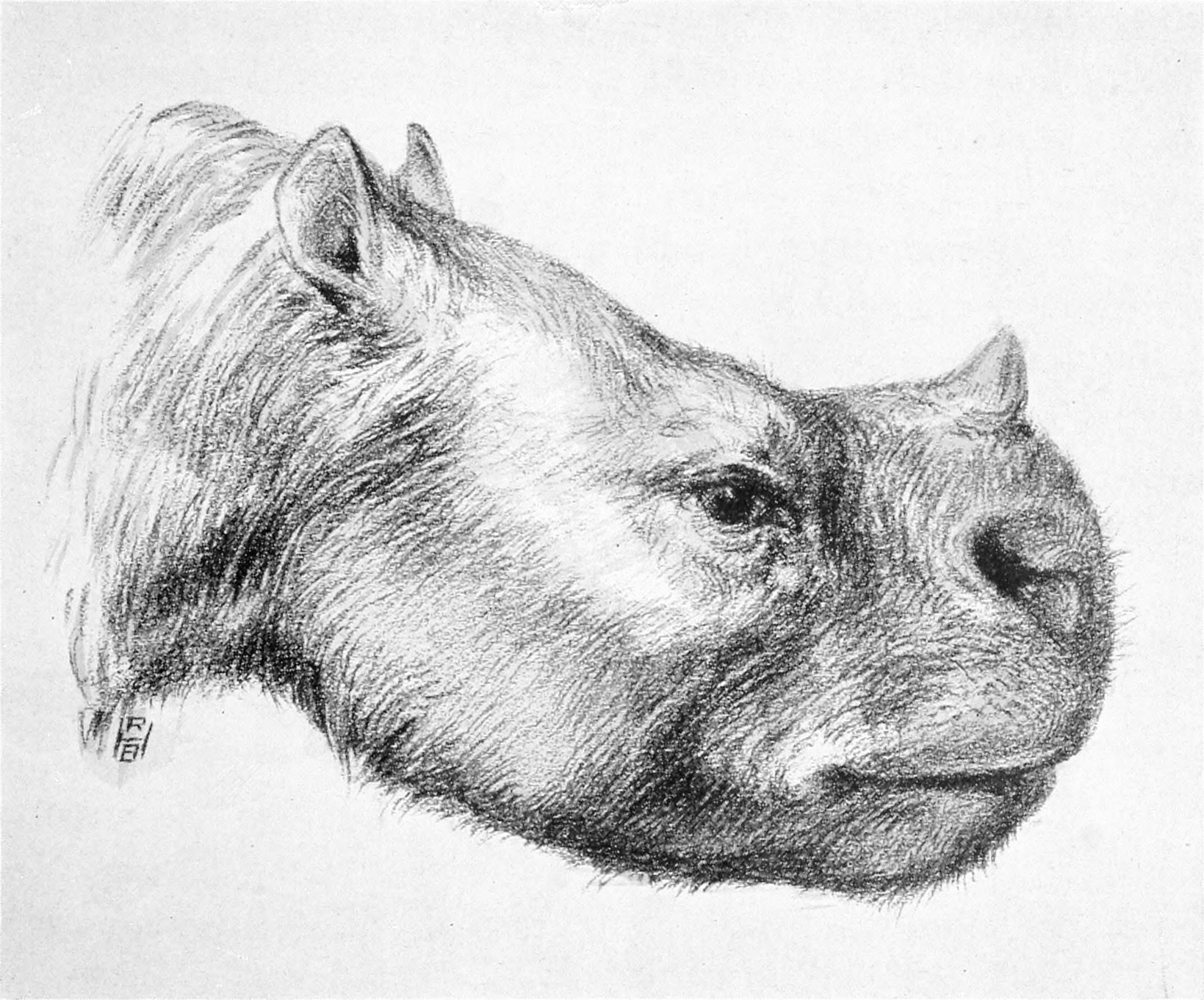
Restoration of L. gaudryi

In Leontinia, the first incisors of the upper jaw are small cropping teeth, while the second are elongated and form caniniform tushes. In the lower jaw it is the third incisors have developed into tusks, not the second. Variations and incisor length have been used to distinguish different species from one another and may possibly provide evidence of sexual dimorphism among certain species. In fact, it has been suggested that different species assigned on the basis of tooth proportion may only represent different genders of the same species. The nasal bones are highly elevated from the nasal cavity and suggest that the animal may have possessed horns resembling those of the rhinocerotid Diceratherium.
