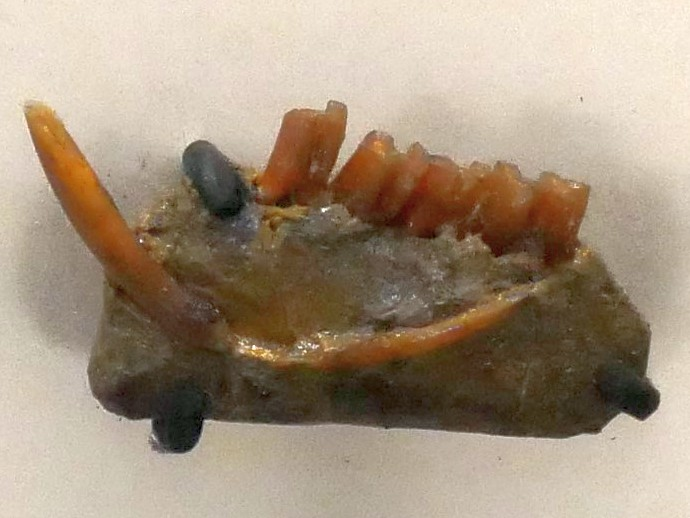
- Mandible of Cephalomys arcidens

Scientific classification
- Kingdom: Animalia
- Phylum: Chordata
- Class: Mammalia
- Infraclass: Placentalia
- Order: Rodentia
- Family: †Cephalomyidae
- Genus: †Cephalomys; Ameghino, 1897

Synonyms
- Orchiomys Ameghino, 1897

= Cephalomys =

Cephalomys Temporal range: Oligocene–Miocene

Extinct genus of mammals

Cephalomys is an extinct genus of rodent that inhabited South America during the Oligocene and Miocene epochs.

== Distribution ==
Cephalomys arcidens inhabited Patagonia during the Late Oligocene.
