= Acarechimys =

Acarechimys Temporal range: Miocene

Scientific classification
- Kingdom: Animalia
- Phylum: Chordata
- Class: Mammalia
- Order: Rodentia
- Parvorder: Caviomorpha
- Genus: †Acarechimys; Patterson, 1965

Type species
- Acaremys minutus Ameghino, 1887

Other species
- Acarechimys minutissimus Ameghino, 1887 Acarechimys constans Ameghino, 1887 Acarechimys gracilis Ameghino, 1891 Acarechimys leucotheae Vucetich et al., 2015 Acarechimys hunikuini Fontoura et al., 2024 Acarechimys manumanta Arnal et al., 2026

Extinct genus of caviomorph rodent

Acarechimys is an extinct genus of caviomorph rodent that lived in South America during the Miocene epoch.

== Distribution ==
Acarechimys minutus is known from Argentina, Chile, and Bolivia. Acarechimys minutissimus is known from Argentina and Colombia, with remains tentatively identified as Acarechimys cf. minutissimus known from Bolivia and Chile as well. Acarechimys constans is only known from Argentina and Chile, while Acarechimys gracilis is exclusively known from Argentina, as is Acarechimys leucotheae. Acarechimys manumanta is known from Peru. Acarechimys hunikuini is known from Brazil.
