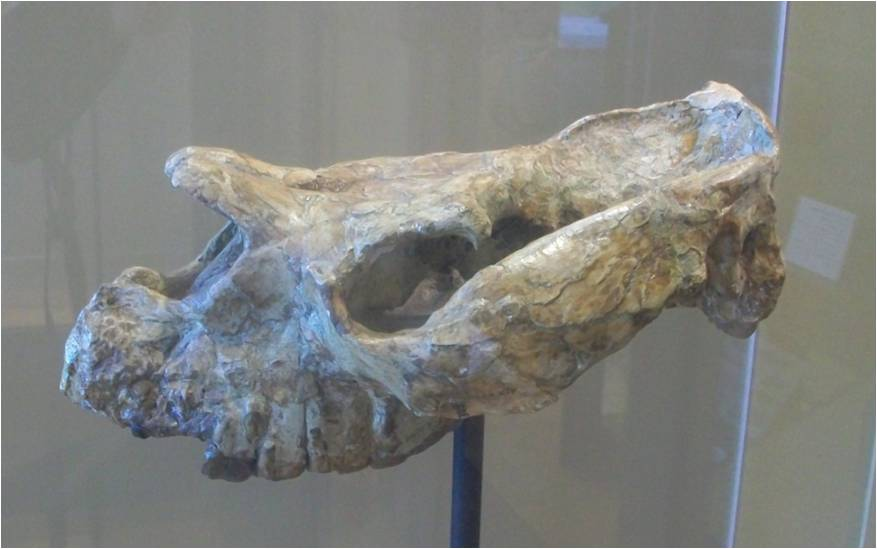
- Leontinia gaudryi

Scientific classification
- Kingdom: Animalia
- Phylum: Chordata
- Class: Mammalia
- Order: †Notoungulata
- Clade: †Eutoxodontia
- Family: †Leontiniidae; Ameghino, 1895

Genera
- Anayatherium Shockey, 2005; Ancylocoelus Ameghino, 1895; Colpodon Burmeister, 1885; Coquenia Deraco et al., 2008; Elmerriggsia Shockey et al., 2012; Gualta Cerdeño & Vera, 2015; Henricofilholia Ameghino, 1901; Huilatherium Villarroel & Guerrero Diaz, 1985; Leontinia Ameghino, 1895; Martinmiguelia Bond & López, 1995; Purperia Paula Couto, 1982; Pyralophodon Ameghino, 1904; Rodiotherium; Scaphops; Scarrittia Simpson, 1934; Stenogenium; Taubatherium Soria & Alvarenga, 1989; Termastherium Wyss et al., 2018

= Leontiniidae =

Leontiniidae Temporal range: Middle Eocene-Late Miocene (Mustersan-Huayquerian) ~48.6–7.3 Ma

Extinct family of mammals

Leontiniidae is an extinct family comprising eighteen genera of notoungulate mammals known from the Middle Eocene (Mustersan) to Late Miocene (Huayquerian) of South America.
