= Federicoanaya =

Federicoanaya Temporal range: Late Oligocene (Deseadan) ~29.0–23.0 Ma

Scientific classification
- Domain: Eukaryota
- Kingdom: Animalia
- Phylum: Chordata
- Class: Mammalia
- Order: †Notoungulata
- Family: †Interatheriidae
- Subfamily: †Interatheriinae
- Genus: †Federicoanaya; Hitz et al. 2008
- Species: †F. sallaensis

Binomial name
- †Federicoanaya sallaensis Hitz et al. 2008

Extinct genus of notoungulates

Federicoanaya is an extinct genus of interatheriine notoungulates that lived during the Late Oligocene in what is now Bolivia. Fossils of this genus have been found in the Salla Formation of Bolivia.

== Etymology ==
The genus name, Federicoanaya, refers to Federico Anaya, known for his significant contributions to Bolivian paleontology. The specific name, sallaensis, refers to the Salla Formation where it was found.

== Description ==
Federicoanaya was a small-sized interatheriid. It can be distinguished from other basal interatheriines such as Proargyrohyrax and Santiagorothia, by having hypselodont cheek teeth an completely persistent lingual sulcus on the upper molars. Its permanent upper dentition had thin cementum. Federicoanaya, along with Brucemacfaddenia, share upper cheek teeth with a median lobe and a labially extended parastyle in molars.

== Taxonomy ==
Federicoanaya was first described in 2008 based on remains found in the Salla Formation, in the La Paz Department, Bolivia, dating to the Late Oligocene, around 29 to 23 mya. It was described alongside another interatheriid, Brucemacfaddenia boliviensis. It is a basal member of the Interatheriidae family, more specifically within the subfamily Interatheriinae.

The following cladogram of the Interatheriinae is based on Vera et al. 2017, showing the position of Federicoanaya.

- Interatheriinae
  - Eopachyrucos pliciferus
  - - Santiagorothia chiliensis
    - - Federicoanaya sallaensis
      - - Brucemacfaddenia boliviensis
        - - Archaeophylus patrius
          - Progaleopithecus tournoueri
          - Argyrohyrax proavus
          - - Interatherium robustum
            - Cochilius volvens
          - - Protypotherium australe
            - - Protypotherium endiadys
              - - Protypotherium distinctum
                - Protypotherium sinclairi
                - Miocochilius federicoi
                - Miocochilius anamopodus
                - - Protypotherium minutum
                  - Protypotherium colloncurensis
