= Brucemacfaddenia =

Brucemacfaddenia Temporal range: Late Oligocene (Deseadan) ~29.0–23.0 Ma

Scientific classification
- Domain: Eukaryota
- Kingdom: Animalia
- Phylum: Chordata
- Class: Mammalia
- Order: †Notoungulata
- Family: †Interatheriidae
- Subfamily: †Interatheriinae
- Genus: †Brucemacfaddenia; Hitz et al. 2008
- Species: †B. boliviensis

Binomial name
- †Brucemacfaddenia boliviensis Hitz et al. 2008

Extinct genus of notoungulates

Brucemacfaddenia is an extinct genus of interatheriine notoungulates that lived during the Late Oligocene in what is now Bolivia. Fossils of this genus have been found in the Salla Formation of Bolivia.

== Etymology ==
The genus name, Brucemacfaddenia, refers to Bruce MacFadden, known for his significant contributions of Cenozoic mammal evolution in Bolivia. paleontology. The specific name, boliviensis, refers to Bolivia, the country where it was found.

== Description ==
Brucemacfaddenia was a small-sized interatheriid. The derived features of Brucemacfaddenia that set it apart from other basal interatheriines such as Proargyrohyrax and Santiagorothia, by having hypselodont cheek teeth an completely persistent lingual sulcus on the upper molars. Its deciduous upper detention had thin enamel.

== Taxonomy ==
Brucemacfaddenia was first described in 2008 based on remains found in the Salla Formation, in the La Paz Department, Bolivia, dating to the Late Oligocene, around 29 to 23 mya. It was described alongside another interatheriid, Federicoanaya sallaensis. It is a basal member of the Interatheriidae family, more specifically within the subfamily Interatheriinae.

The following cladogram of the Interatheriinae is based on Vera et al. 2017, showing the position of Brucemacfaddenia.

- Interatheriinae
  - Eopachyrucos pliciferus
  - - Santiagorothia chiliensis
    - - Federicoanaya sallaensis
      - - Brucemacfaddenia boliviensis
        - - Archaeophylus patrius
          - Progaleopithecus tournoueri
          - Argyrohyrax proavus
          - - Interatherium robustum
            - Cochilius volvens
          - - Protypotherium australe
            - - Protypotherium endiadys
              - - Protypotherium distinctum
                - Protypotherium sinclairi
                - Miocochilius federicoi
                - Miocochilius anamopodus
                - - Protypotherium minutum
                  - Protypotherium colloncurensis
