= Santa Cruz Formation =

Geological formation in Patagonia

- Stratigraphic range: Burdigalian-Langhian (Santacrucian-Friasian); ~18–15.2 Ma
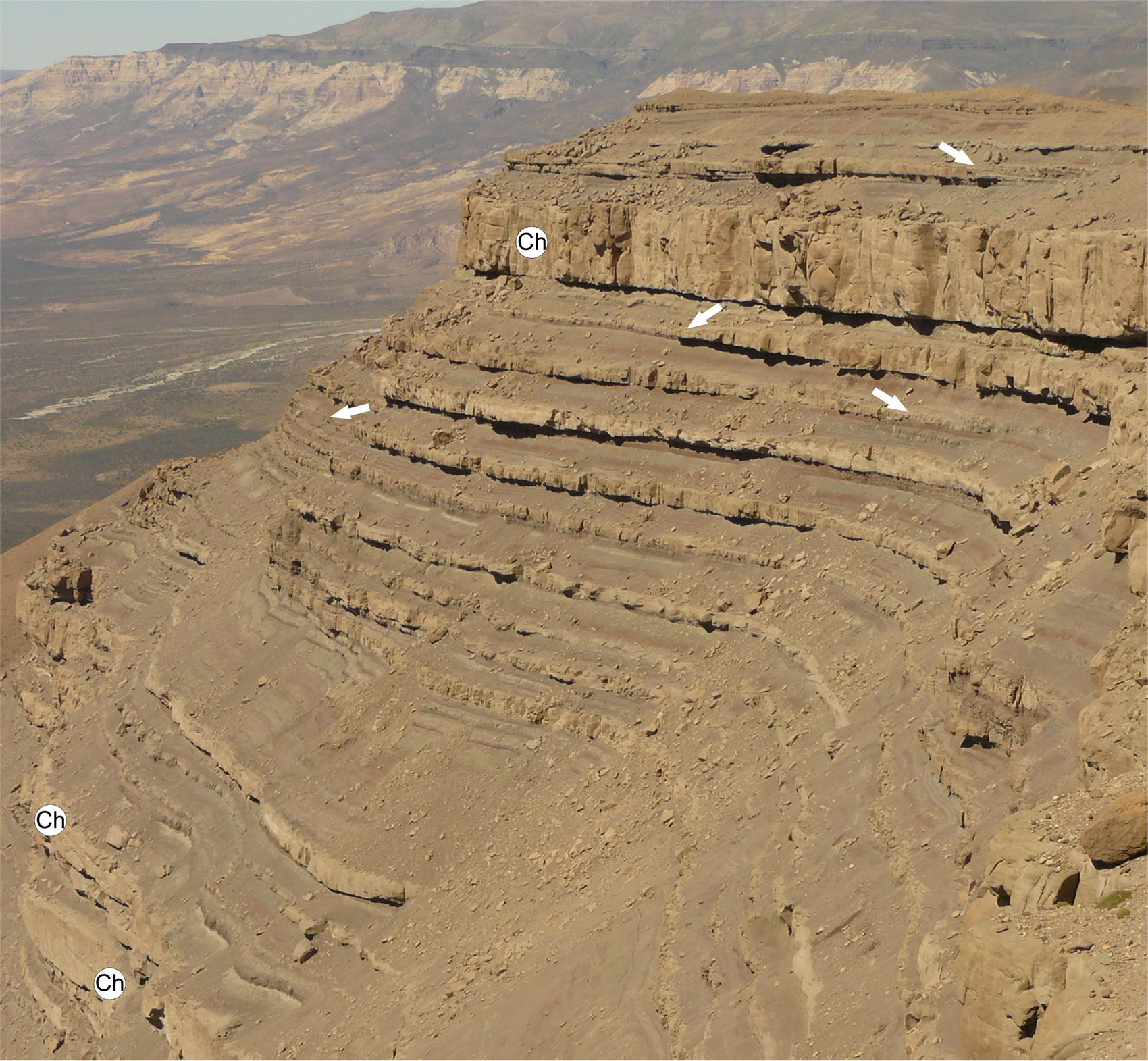
- Type: Geological formation
- Sub-units: Estancia La Costa Member, Estancia La Angelina Member (coastal section)
- Underlies: Cerro Boleadoras Formation
- Overlies: Monte Léon Formation
- Thickness: Over 295 metres

Lithology
- Primary: Tuff, claystone, mudstone (Estancia La Costa Member); Claystone, mudstone, sandstone (Estancia La Angelina Member)

Location
- Country: Argentina, Chile
- Extent: Austral Basin

Type section
- Named by: Furque & Camacho
- Location: near Lago Argentino
- Year defined: 1972
- Santa Cruz Province in Argentina, where the majority of the formation of exposed

The Santa Cruz Formation is a geological formation in the Magallanes/Austral Basin in southern Patagonia in Argentina and adjacent areas of Chile. It dates to the late Early Miocene epoch, and is contemporaneous with the eponymous Santacrucian age of the SALMA (South American land mammal age) timescale. The Santa Cruz Formation is known for its abundance of vertebrate fossils, including South American native ungulates (astrapotheres, litopterns, notoungulates), as well as rodents, xenarthrans (armadillos, sloths, anteaters), and metatherians.

The formation extends from the Andes to the Atlantic coast. In its coastal section it is divided into two members, the lower, fossil rich Estancia La Costa Member, which consists predominately of tuffaceous deposits and fine grained mudrock, and the upper fossil-poor Estancia La Angelina Member, which consists of sedimentary rock, primarily mudrock, and sandstone. The environment of deposition was mostly fluvial, with the lowermost part of the Estancia La Costa Member being transitional between fluvial and marine conditions. The environment of the Estancia La Costa Member is thought to have been relatively warm and humid, but likely became somewhat cooler and drier towards the end of the sequence.

== Stratigraphy ==
The Santa Cruz Formation is exposed in isolated outcrops across the Magallanes/Austral Basin extending from the Atlantic coast to the Andes, especially along the Santa Cruz River, as well as along the southern coastline of Santa Cruz Province. While primarily located in Argentina, small outcrops are also found in Chile. The base of the formation is defined by a marine regression event transitioning from the marine environment of the underlying Monte Léon Formation, which formed when large areas of Patagonia were submerged as a part of the Patagoniense Transgression.

The main source of sediment input to the basin was from the Andean orogeny to the west. The formation reaches a maximum thickness of over 295 meters, though the total thickness of the formation is strongly controlled by subsequent erosion and the 295 meters likely does not represent a complete sequence. The formation primarily consists of floodplain deposits. The lower parts of the formation have an abundance of tuffs and tuffaceous sediments. These likely originated from distant eruptions that were transported into the basin by aerial fallout, wind and/or river transport. The formation likely spans an approximately 3 million year interval in the late Early Miocene around 18 to 15.2 million years ago, during the Burdigalian and Langhian stages.

== Paleoenvironment ==
The environment of the Santa Cruz Formation is thought to have been relatively warm and humid, including a mix of open savanna, gallery forests and semi-deciduous forests. Permanent bodies of water such as lakes, ponds and streams are likely to have been present.

== Paleoflora ==
Name	Species	Locality	Material	Notes	Image
Nothofagus	Indeterminate	Rincón del Buque, Punta Sur	Leaves, wood		
Araucaria	Indeterminate	Punta Sur	Twig	Morphologically similar to A. marensii from the Eocene of Antarctica	
Lauraceae	Indeterminate	Punta Sur	Wood	Assigned to form genus Laurinoxylon	
Myrceugenia	M. chubutense	Punta Sur	Wood	A member of the family Myrtaceae	
Eucryphiaceoxylon	E. eucryphioides	Punta Sur	Wood	Wood probably belonging to the genus Eucryphia	
Faboideae	Indeterminate	Punta Sur	Wood	Possible affinities to Sophora (Fabaceae)	
Doroteoxylon	D. vicenti-perezii	Punta Sur	Wood	Wood with affinities to the subfamily Caesalpinioideae	
Akanioxylon	A. santacrucensis	Punta Sur	Wood	A member of the family Akaniaceae	
Chloridoideae	Indeterminate		Phytoliths	Grass	
Panicoideae	Indeterminate		Phytoliths	Grass	
Danthonioideae	Indeterminate		Phytoliths	Grass	
Pooideae	Indeterminate		Phytoliths	Grass	

== Paleofauna ==
=== Invertebrates ===
Name	Species	Material	Notes	Image
Crassostrea	C. orbignyi	Numerous individuals in large beds at the base of the formation	A marine true oyster	
Diplodon	D. cf. colhuapiensis		A freshwater bivalve belonging to Hyriidae	
Stephadiscus	Indeterminate		A terrestrial gastropod belonging to Charopidae	
Gastrocopta	G.patagonica		A terrestrial gastropod belonging to Vertiginidae	
?Scolodonta	Indeterminate		A terrestrial gastropod belonging to Scolodontidae	
Punctum	P. patagonicum		A terrestrial gastropod belonging to Punctidae	
Zilchogyra	Z. miocenica		A terrestrial gastropod belonging to Charopidae	
Patagocharopa	P. enigmatica		A terrestrial gastropod of uncertain affinities, possibly a member of Charopidae	
Porifera	Unspecified	Spicules	Freshwater sponge	
Bacillariophyceae	Unspecified	Frustules	Freshwater diatoms	
Chrysophyceae	Unspecified		Freshwater algae	

=== Amphibians ===
Name	Species	Locality	Material	Notes	Image
Calyptocephalella	C. parodii	Rincón del Buque		A calyptocephalellid frog	
Calyptocephalella	C. cf. C. canqueli	Cañadón de las Vacas		A calyptocephalellid frog	
Neobatrachia	Indeterminate	Estancia La Costa	Skull fragments and presacral vertebrate	A frog originally assigned to "Leptodactylidae", but requires further investigation	

=== Birds ===
Name	Species	Locality	Material	Notes	Image
Anisolornis	A. excavatus			A bird of uncertain affinities, authors have varyingly suggested affinities to trumpeters or limpkins	
Ankonetta	A. larriestrai		Partial tarsometatarsus	A basal member of Anatidae	
Badiostes	B. patagonicus			A member of the family Falconidae	
Brontornis	B. burmeisteri			Controversial taxonomic position, either considered a terror bird or an anserimorph	
Dryornis	D. pampeanusD. hatcheri		Two partial left humerus	A New World vulture.	
Eutelornis	E. patagonicus E. australis		Limb fragments	A member of Anseriformes, relationships of the species to each other or to other Ansiferiformes is uncertain	
Liptornis	L. hesternus			A member of Anhingidae	
Macranhinga	Indeterminate			A member of Anhingidae	
Miocariama	M. santacrucensis		Partial cranium and tibiotarsi fragments	A seriema	
Nothurinae	2 Indeterminate species			Tinamou	
Opisthodactylus	O. patagonicus		Limb, vertebra and skull fragments	A member of Rheidae	
Patagornis	P. marshi			A terror bird	
Phorusrhacos	P. longissimus		Partial skulls	A terror bird	
Protibis	P. cnemialis		distal end of tibiotarsus	Potentially a spoonbill	
Psilopterus	P. lemoinei P. bachmanni			A terror bird	
Thegornis	T. musculosus T. debilis			A member of the family Falconidae	
Archaeopsophia	A. aoni			A member of the family Psophiidae (trumpeters)	
Chehuenia	C. facongrandei			A roller	
Kaikenia	K. mourerchauvirea			An anatid belonging to the subfamily Tadorninae	
Peioa	P. australis			A member of Anseriformes.	

=== Squamates ===
Name	Species	Locality	Material	Notes	Image
Pristidactylus	Indeterminate	La Cueva	Fragmentary jaw bones	Originally assigned to the dubious genus "Erichosaurus"	
Pleurodonta	Indeterminate	La Cueva	Fragmentary jaw bones	Originally assigned to the dubious genus "Erichosaurus"	
Tupinambis	Indeterminate	Monte León	Fragmentary dentaries and maxilla	A teiid lizard	
Colubridae	Indeterminate	Cerro Observatorio	Partial trunk vertebrae	A snake	

=== Mammals ===
==== Meridiungulates ====
===== Astrapotheres =====
Name	Species	Locality	Material	Notes	Image
Astrapotherium	A. magnum A. nanum A. sp.			An astrapotheriid	

===== Litopterns =====
Name	Species	Locality	Material	Notes	Image
Adianthus	A. bucatus			An adianthid litoptern	
Anisolophus	A. australis A. floweri			A proterotheriid litoptern	
Diadiaphorus	D. majusculus D. sanctaecrucis D. sp.			A proterotheriid litoptern	
Tetramerorhinus	T. cingulatum T. fleaglei T. mixtum T. lucarius T. prosistens T. sp.	Estancia La Costa Member		A proterotheriid litoptern	
Theosodon	T. fontanae T. garretorum T. gracilis T. karaikensis T. lydekkeri T. patagonicum	Estancia La Costa Member		A macraucheniid litoptern	
Thoatherium	T. minisculum T. sp.	Estancia La Costa Member		A proterotheriid litoptern	

===== Notoungulates =====
Name	Species	Locality	Material	Notes	Image
Adinotherium	A. ovinum A. robustum A. sp.			A toxodontid notoungulate	
Cochilius	C. sp.			An interatheriid notoungulate	
Hegetotherium	H. mirabile H. sp.			A hegetotheriid notoungulate	
Homalodotherium	H. cunninghami			A homalodotheriid notoungulate	
Interatherium	I. anguliferum I. brevifrons I. dentatum I. interruptum I. robustum I. rodens I. supernum			An interatheriid notoungulate	
Neoicochilus	N. undulatus			An interatheriid notoungulate	
Nesodon	N. imbricatus			A toxodontid notoungulate	
Notohippus	N. toxodontoides			A notohippid notoungulate	
Pachyrukhos	P. moyani			A hegetotheriid notoungulate	
Patriarchus	P. palmidens			An interatheriid notoungulate	
Protypotherium	P. attenuatum P. australe P. praerutilum P. sp.			An interatheriid notoungulate	

==== Xenarthrans ====
===== Pilosa =====
Name	Species	Locality	Material	Notes	Image
Analcimorphus	A. giganteus A. inversus	Estancia La Costa Member		A basal megatherioid sloth	
Analcitherium	A. antarcticum	Estancia La Costa Member		A scelidotheriid sloth	
Eucholoeops	E. fronto E. ingens E. litoralis E. titans	Estancia La Costa Member		A megalonychid ground sloth	
Hapalops	H. longiceps H. elongatus H. indifferens H. angustipalatus H. platycephalus H. ponderosus H. rectangularis			A ground sloth belonging to Megatherioidea	
Hyperleptus	Indeterminate			A megatherioid ground sloth of uncertain affinities	
Megalonychotherium	M. atavus			A megalonychid ground sloth	
Mylodontidae	Indeterminate				
Nematherium	N. angulatum			A ground sloth belonging to Mylodontoidea	
Pelecyodon	P. cristatus			A ground sloth	
Planops	P. magnus			A megatheriid ground sloth	
Protamandua	P. rothi			An anteater	
Prepotherium	P. potens P. filholi			A ground sloth	
Megalonychidae	Indeterminate			A ground sloth	
Schismotherium	S. fractum			A ground sloth	
Xyophorus	X. atlanticus X. latirostris			A nothrotheriid ground sloth	

===== Cingulata =====
Name	Species	Locality	Material	Notes	Image
Anantiosodon	A. rarus			An armadillo	
cf. Asterostemma	cf. A. depressa			A glyptodont	
Cochlops	C. muricatus			A glyptodont	
Eucinepeltus	E. petesatus			A glyptodont	
Metopotoxus	M. laevatus			A glyptodont	
Parutaetus	P. sp.			An armadillo	
Peltephilus	P. ferox P. giganteus P. nanus P. pumilus P. strepens			A horned armadillo	
Proeutatus	P. carinatus P. deleo P. lagena P. oenophorus P. robustus			An armadillo	
Propalaehoplophorus	P. australis P. incisivus P. minus			A glyptodont	
Prozaedyus	P. exilis P. proximus			An armadillo	
Stenotatus	S. patagonicus			An armadillo	
Stegotherium	S. tauberi S. tessellatum			An armadillo	
Vetelia	V. puncta			An armadillo	

==== Metatherians ====
Name	Species	Locality	Material	Notes	Image
Abderites	A. meridionalis			A member of Abderitidae (Paucituberculata)	
Acdestis	A. owenii A. lemairei			A member of Palaeothentidae (Paucituberculata)	
Acrocyon	A. sectorius			A borhyaenid sparassodont	
Acyon	A. tricuspidatus			A hathliacynid sparassodont	
Arctodictis	A. munizi			A borhyaenid sparassodont	
Borhyaena	B. tuberata			A borhyaenid sparassodont	
Cladosictis	C. patagonia			A sparassodont	
Lycopsis	L. torresi			A sparassodont	
Microbiotherium	M. acicula M. patagonicum M. gallegosense M. tehuelchum			A member of Microbiotheriidae (Microbiotheria)	
Palaeothentes	P. aratae P. minutus P. intermedius P. lemoinei P. pascuali			A member of Palaeothentidae (Paucituberculata)	
Perathereutes	P. pungens			A hathliacynid sparassodont	
Phonocdromus	P. gracilis			A member of Pichipilidae (Paucituberculata)	
Prothylacinus	P. patagonicus			A sparassodont	
Pseudonotictis	P. pusillus			A hathliacynid sparassodont	
Sipalocyon	S. gracilis S. obusta			A hathliacynid sparassodont	
Stilotherium	S. dissimile			A member of Caenolestidae (Paucituberculata)	

==== Rodents ====
Name	Species	Locality	Material	Notes	Image
Acarechimys	A. minutus A. minutissmus A. constans A. gracilis			A member of Octodontoidea	
Acaremys	A. murinus A. messor			A member of Acaremyidae (Octodontoidea)	
Adelphomys	A. candidus			A member of Octodontoidea	
Dudumus	Indeterminate, potentially new species			A member of Octodontoidea	
Eocardia	E. montana "E". excavata "E". fissa			A member of Cavioidea	
Neoreomys	N. australis			A member of Cavioidea	
Perimys	P. erutus P. onustus P. incavatus			A member of Chinchilloidea	
Phanomys	P. mixtus P. vetulus			A member of Cavioidea	
Pliolagostomus	P. notatus			A member of Chinchilloidea	
Prolagostomus	P. pusilllus			A member of Chinchilloidea	
Prospaniomys	Indeterminate, potentially new species			A member of Octodontoidea	
Pseudoacaremys	P. kramarzi			A member of the family Acaremyidae (Octodontoidea)	
Schistomys	S. erro			A member of Cavioidea	
Sciamys	S. principalis S. varians S. latidens			A member of the family Acaremyidae (Octodontoidea)	
Scleromys	S. angustus			A member of Chinchilloidea	
Spaniomys	S. riparius S. regularis			A member of Octodontoidea	
Steiromys	S. dentatus S. duplicatus			A member of Erethizontoidea	

==== Primates ====
Name	Species	Locality	Material	Notes	Image
Homunculus	H. patagonicus, H. vizcainoi		Several skulls, a number of postcranial bones, as well as a partial skeleton	A New World monkey	

==== Meridiolestida ====
Name	Species	Locality	Material	Notes	Image
Necrolestes	N. patagonicus		Skull and postcranial remains	A mole-like meridiolestidan, youngest known member of the group	
