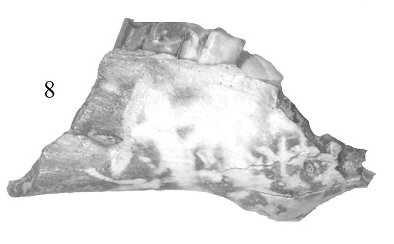
- Mandible of Eopachyrucos pliciformis

Scientific classification
- Kingdom: Animalia
- Phylum: Chordata
- Class: Mammalia
- Order: †Notoungulata
- Family: †Interatheriidae
- Subfamily: †Interatheriinae
- Genus: †Eopachyrucos; Ameghino 1901

Type species
- †Eopachyrucos pliciformis Ameghino, 1901

Species
- E. pliciferus Ameghino 1901; E. pliciformis Ameghino 1894; E. ranchoverdensis Reguero et al. 2003

Synonyms
- Eupachyrucos Ameghino 1906

= Eopachyrucos =

Eopachyrucos Temporal range: Middle Eocene-Late Oligocene (Mustersan-Deseadan) ~48–23.0 Ma

Extinct genus of notoungulates

Eopachyrucos is an extinct genus of interatheriid notoungulates that lived from the Middle Eocene to the Late Oligocene of Argentina and Uruguay. Fossils of this genus have been found in the Sarmiento Formation of Argentina and the Fray Bentos Formation of Uruguay.

== Taxonomy ==
Eopachyrucos was first named in 1901 by Florentino Ameghino based on fragmentary remains found in the Sarmiento Formation of Argentina. He originally considered it as a member of the family Hegetotheriidae, as an ancestor of Pachyrukhos, as reflected in its name ("dawn Pachyrukhos"), however, recent studies have confirmed it to be a member of the family Interatheriidae, more specifically within the subfamily Interatheriinae.

The following cladogram of the Interatheriinae is based on Vera et al. 2017, showing the position of Eopachyrucos.

- Interatheriinae
  - Eopachyrucos pliciferus
  - - Santiagorothia chiliensis
    - - Federicoanaya sallaensis
      - - Brucemacfaddenia boliviensis
        - - Archaeophylus patrius
          - Progaleopithecus tournoueri
          - Argyrohyrax proavus
          - - Interatherium robustum
            - Cochilius volvens
          - - Protypotherium australe
            - - Protypotherium endiadys
              - - Protypotherium distinctum
                - Protypotherium sinclairi
                - Miocochilius federicoi
                - Miocochilius anamopodus
                - - Protypotherium minutum
                  - Protypotherium colloncurensis
