= Patriarchus =

Patriarchus Temporal range: Early Miocene ~20 Ma

Scientific classification
- Kingdom: Animalia
- Phylum: Chordata
- Class: Mammalia
- Order: †Notoungulata
- Family: †Interatheriidae
- Subfamily: †Interatheriinae
- Genus: †Patriarchus; Ameghino, 1889

Type species
- †Patriarchus palmidens Ameghino, 1889

Extinct genus of notoungulates

Patriarchus is an extinct genus of interatheriid notoungulates that lived during the Early Miocene in what is now Argentina. Fossils of this genus have been found in the Santa Cruz Formation of Argentina.

== Description ==
It was a small-sized animal, approximately 40 centimeters long, excluding the tail. Its body shape vaguely resembled a rabbit or a marmot, and its head ended in a pointed muzzle. Patriarchus shared many similarities with Protypotherium, with which it is often confused with, and differed from it through certain characteristics of its teeth. The first lower incisor and the lower canine were expanded in their terminal part, labially convex and similar in shape and size; they had a short lingual sulcus, not extending to the base of the teeth and V-shaped in occlusal view. The first lower premolar was bilobed, with a trigonid larger than the thalonid. The inferior dental series between the first incisor and the first premolar was continuous and the teeth did not overlap.

== Classification ==
Patriarchus palmidens was first described in 1889 by Florentino Ameghino based on fossilized remains found in Early Miocene terrains from Rio Bote locality of the Santa Cruz Formation in southern Patagonia. Ameghino described several other species belonging to the genus, Patriarchus diastematus, P. furculosus, P. icochiloides, P. leptocephalus and P. rectus, but in 1900 the genus was synonymized with a Protypotherium. In 2019 a cladistic analysis revealed sufficient differences between the type species Patriarchus palmidens and Protypotherium to allow the re-establishment of the genus Patriarchus. According to this study, the genus Patriarchus includes only the type species and is a derived member of the family Interatheriidae, closely related with Miocochilius; this clade being the sister group of another clade comprising Cochilius and Interatherium.
