= Progaleopithecus =

Progaleopithecus Temporal range: Late Oligocene (Deseadan) ~28.4–23.03 Ma

Scientific classification
- Kingdom: Animalia
- Phylum: Chordata
- Class: Mammalia
- Order: †Notoungulata
- Family: †Interatheriidae
- Subfamily: †Interatheriinae
- Genus: †Progaleopithecus; Ameghino 1904

Type species
- †Progaleopithecus tournoueri Ameghino, 1904

Species
- P. tournoueri Ameghino 1904; P. fissurellatus Ameghino 1904

Extinct genus of notoungulates

Progaleopithecus is an extinct genus of interatheriid notoungulate that lived during the Late Oligocene of Argentina. Fossils of this genus have been found in the Agua de la Piedra, Deseado, and Sarmiento Formations of Argentina.

== Taxonomy ==
Progaleopithecus was first named in 1904 by Florentino Ameghino based on remains found in the Sarmiento Formation of Argentina, dating to the Late Oligocene, around 28 to 23 mya. It is a derived member of the Interatheriidae, within the subfamily Interatheriinae.

The following cladogram of the Interatheriinae is based on Vera et al. 2017, showing the position of Progaleopithecus.

- Interatheriinae
  - Eopachyrucos pliciferus
  - - Santiagorothia chiliensis
    - - Federicoanaya sallaensis
      - - Brucemacfaddenia boliviensis
        - - Archaeophylus patrius
          - Progaleopithecus tournoueri
          - Argyrohyrax proavus
          - - Interatherium robustum
            - Cochilius volvens
          - - Protypotherium australe
            - - Protypotherium endiadys
              - - Protypotherium distinctum
                - Protypotherium sinclairi
                - Miocochilius federicoi
                - Miocochilius anamopodus
                - - Protypotherium minutum
                  - Protypotherium colloncurensis
