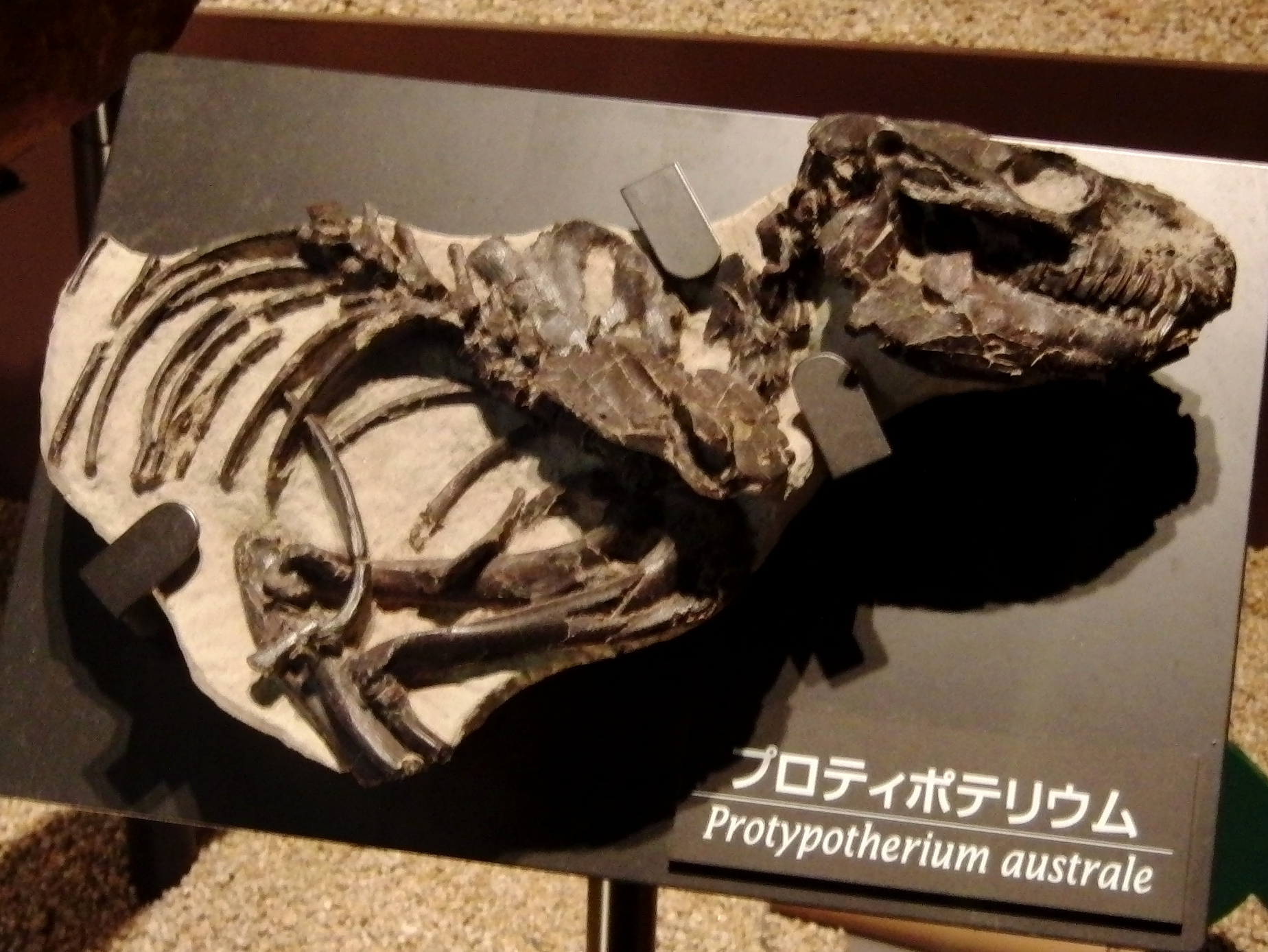
- Fossil of P. australe. Exhibit in the National Museum of Nature and Science, Tokyo, Japan.

Scientific classification
- Kingdom: Animalia
- Phylum: Chordata
- Class: Mammalia
- Order: †Notoungulata
- Suborder: †Typotheria
- Family: †Interatheriidae
- Subfamily: †Interatheriinae; Ameghino, 1887

Genera
- †Archaeophylus; †Argyrohyrax; †Boleatherium; †Brucemacfaddenia; †Caenophilus; †Choichephilum; †Cochilius; †Eopachyrucos; †Federicoanaya; †Interatherium; †Juchuysillu; †Miocochilius; †Neoicochilus; †Patriarchus; †Proargyrohyrax; †Progaleopithecus; †Protypotherium; †Santiagorothia

= Interatheriinae =

Interatheriinae Temporal range: Early Eocene-Early Pliocene (Casamayoran-Montehermosan) ~54.0–5.3 Ma

Extinct subfamily of mammals

Interatheriinae is an extinct subfamily of interatheriids that consisted of notoungulates dating from the Early Eocene (Casamayoran SALMA) to the Early Pliocene (Montehermosan SALMA). The subfamily includes the genera Archaeophylus, Argyrohyrax, Boleatherium, Brucemacfaddenia, Caenophilus, Choichephilum, Cochilius, Eopachyrucos, Federicoanaya, Interatherium, Juchuysillu, Miocochilius, Neoicochilus, Patriarchus, Proargyrohyrax, Progaleopithecus, Protypotherium, and Santiagorothia. They were small to medium sized interatheres, and when compared to the other subfamily, Notopithecinae, interatheriines are found to occupy an advanced, derived position in the family.

== Description ==
Interatheriines were generally small to medium-sized interatheriids, and rarely exceeded the size of a groundhog. Compared with the other representatives of the suborder Typotheria, interatheriiness were mainly characterized by certain dental features, including the absence of roots in the anterior incisors. The skulls of interatheriines were usually equipped with full dentition. The best-known forms include Protypotherium, which was long-legged and vaguely rabbit-like in terms of appearance, and Interatherium, which was short-legged and weasel-like in terms of appearance, both from the Early Miocene. Other well-known genera are Cochilius, akin to the previous ones, and the bizarre Miocochilius, equipped with long two-toed legs, presumably an extreme adaptation to running.

== Taxonomy ==
The subfamily Interatheriinae was established in 1887 by Florentino Ameghino. The Interatheriinae subfamily includes the most derived interatheriids, the most derived of which include Boleatherium, Caenophilus, Choichephilum, Cochilius, Interatherium, Juchuysillu, Miocochilius, and Protypotherium. According to Vera et al. 2017, the Interatheriinae is defined as "the most recent common ancestor of Eopachyrucos pliciferus and Interatherium robustum, and all of its descendants".

The following cladogram of the Interatheriinae is based on Vera et al. 2017.

- Interatheriinae
  - Eopachyrucos pliciferus
  - - Santiagorothia chiliensis
    - - Federicoanaya sallaensis
      - - Brucemacfaddenia boliviensis
        - - Archaeophylus patrius
          - Progaleopithecus tournoueri
          - Argyrohyrax proavus
          - - Interatherium robustum
            - Cochilius volvens
          - - Protypotherium australe
            - - Protypotherium endiadys
              - - Protypotherium distinctum
                - Protypotherium sinclairi
                - Miocochilius federicoi
                - Miocochilius anamopodus
                - - Protypotherium minutum
                  - Protypotherium colloncurensis
