= Juchuysillu =

Juchuysillu Temporal range: Early Miocene-Middle Miocene (Colhuehuapian-Colloncuran) ~18–15 Ma

Scientific classification
- Domain: Eukaryota
- Kingdom: Animalia
- Phylum: Chordata
- Class: Mammalia
- Order: †Notoungulata
- Family: †Interatheriidae
- Genus: †Juchuysillu; Croft & Anaya, 2020
- Species: †J. arenalesensis

Binomial name
- †Juchuysillu arenalesensis Croft & Anaya, 2020

Extinct genus of notoungulates

Juchuysillu is an extinct genus of interatheriid notoungulate. It lived from the Early to the Middle Miocene, and its fossils have been found in Bolivia.

== Description ==
This animal would have been vaguely similar to a present-day guinea pig, and must not have been much over a kilogram in weight. Juchuysillu is known only from sparse fossil remains comprising jaws and jaws with teeth, but from comparison with some similar and better known animals such as Cochilius, Interatherium and Protypotherium, it is possible to speculate on its appearance. Juchuysillu was distinguished from related genera mainly by its tiny size, but mainly by a unique combination of dentition characters: weak grooves were present on the upper third and fourth premolar, the molars were in descending order from first to third and trapezoidal in shape, and the lower third molar lacked a buccal talon groove.

== Classification ==
Juchuysillu arenalesensis was first described in 2020, based on fossil remains found in the Nazareno Formation in southern Bolivia, dating to the Early to Middle Miocene. Another specimen attributed to the same species comes from the Cerdas area, in Bolivia, in somewhat more recent deposits. Juchuysillu is a representative of the Interatheriidae, a family of typothere notoungulates comprising forms of varied size and appearance. Specifically, phylogenetic analyses would show Juchuysillu in an ancestral position relative to several species of interatheriids such as Miocochilius anomopodus, Caenophilus tripartitus, Miocochilius federicoi and various species of Protypotherium (including the well-known P. australe), but more derived than Protypotherium sinclairi.
