= Boleatherium =

Boleatherium Temporal range: Early-Mid Miocene (Santacrucian-Friasian) ~17.5–16 Ma

Scientific classification
- Kingdom: Animalia
- Phylum: Chordata
- Class: Mammalia
- Order: †Notoungulata
- Family: †Interatheriidae
- Genus: †Boleatherium; Vera et al. 2021
- Species: †B. praeludium

Binomial name
- †Boleatherium praeludium Vera et al. 2021

Extinct genus of notoungulates

Boleatherium is an extinct genus of interatheriid notoungulate that lived from the Early to Middle Miocene of what is now Argentina. Fossils of this genus have been found in the Cerro Boleadoras Formation, the formation which this genus was named after.

== Description ==
This animal, although only known from a partial skeleton, may have been vaguely similar to a Patagonian mara, with elongated legs and a long tail. Boleatherium was very similar to members of the genus Protypotherium, from which it differed in some respects. The exclusive features of Boleatherium included the first lower premolar being longer than the other premolars and the lingual contact between the trigonid and talonid in the last three lower premolars and the last two lower molar. Boleatherium also possessed ancestral traits, such as the second lower premolar longer than the other ones, with a well-developed talonid and derived traits, such as a triangular talonid, short contact between trigonid and talonid in the lower molars. The tarsal bone of Boleatherium was intermediate in shape between the unspecialized bones of Protypotherium australe and the exceptionally specialized running bones of Miocochilius anomopodus.

== Classification ==
Boleatherium is a representative of the family Interatheriidae, encompassing numerous rodent-like forms that lived throughout much of the Cenozoic. Boleatherium was first described in 2021, based on a partial skeleton from the Cerro Boleadoras formation in the northwest of Santa Cruz Province in Argentina. Phylogenetic analyses indicate that Boleatherium was most closely related to other Miocene interatheriids such as Caenophilus, Juchuysillu, Protypotherium and Miocochilius, but it is not entirely clear what the actual relationships between these forms were.
