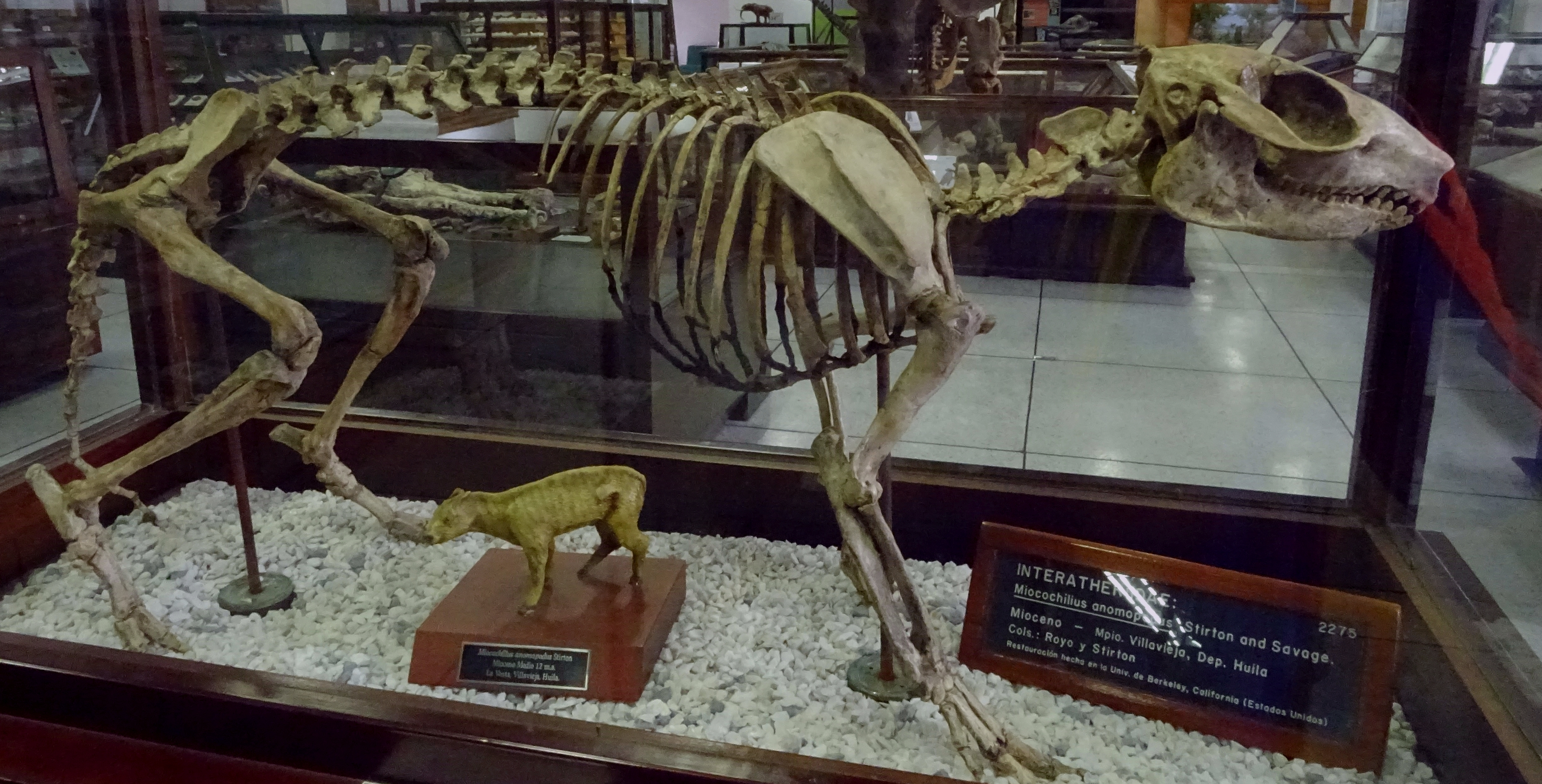
- Reconstructed skeleton of Miocochilius anomopodus. Exhibit in the Museo Paleontológico José Royo y Gómez, Bogotá, Colombia

Scientific classification
- Domain: Eukaryota
- Kingdom: Animalia
- Phylum: Chordata
- Class: Mammalia
- Order: †Notoungulata
- Family: †Interatheriidae
- Subfamily: †Interatheriinae
- Genus: †Miocochilius; Stirton 1953

Type species
- †Miocochilius anamopodus Stirton 1953

Species
- M. anomopodus Stirton 1953 (type); M. federicoi Croft 2007

= Miocochilius =

Miocochilius Temporal range: Mid Miocene (Laventan) ~13.8–11.8 Ma

Extinct genus of notoungulates

Miocochilius is an extinct genus of small notoungulate mammals (typotheres) native to South America. The genus lived during the Middle Miocene epoch (Laventan in the SALMA classification). The genus contains two described species, the type species M. anomopodus described in 1953 by Ruben Arthur Stirton and M. federicoi, described and included in the genus by Darin A. Croft.

Fossils of Miocochilius have been found at the Lagerstätte of La Venta in the Honda Group of Colombia, where it is the most abundant mammal, the Honda Group of Bolivia (M. federicoi) and the Ipururo Formation in the Ucayali Basin of Peru. The typothere lived alongside a rich faunal assemblage comprising many other mammals, crocodylians, turtles and lizards.

== Description ==
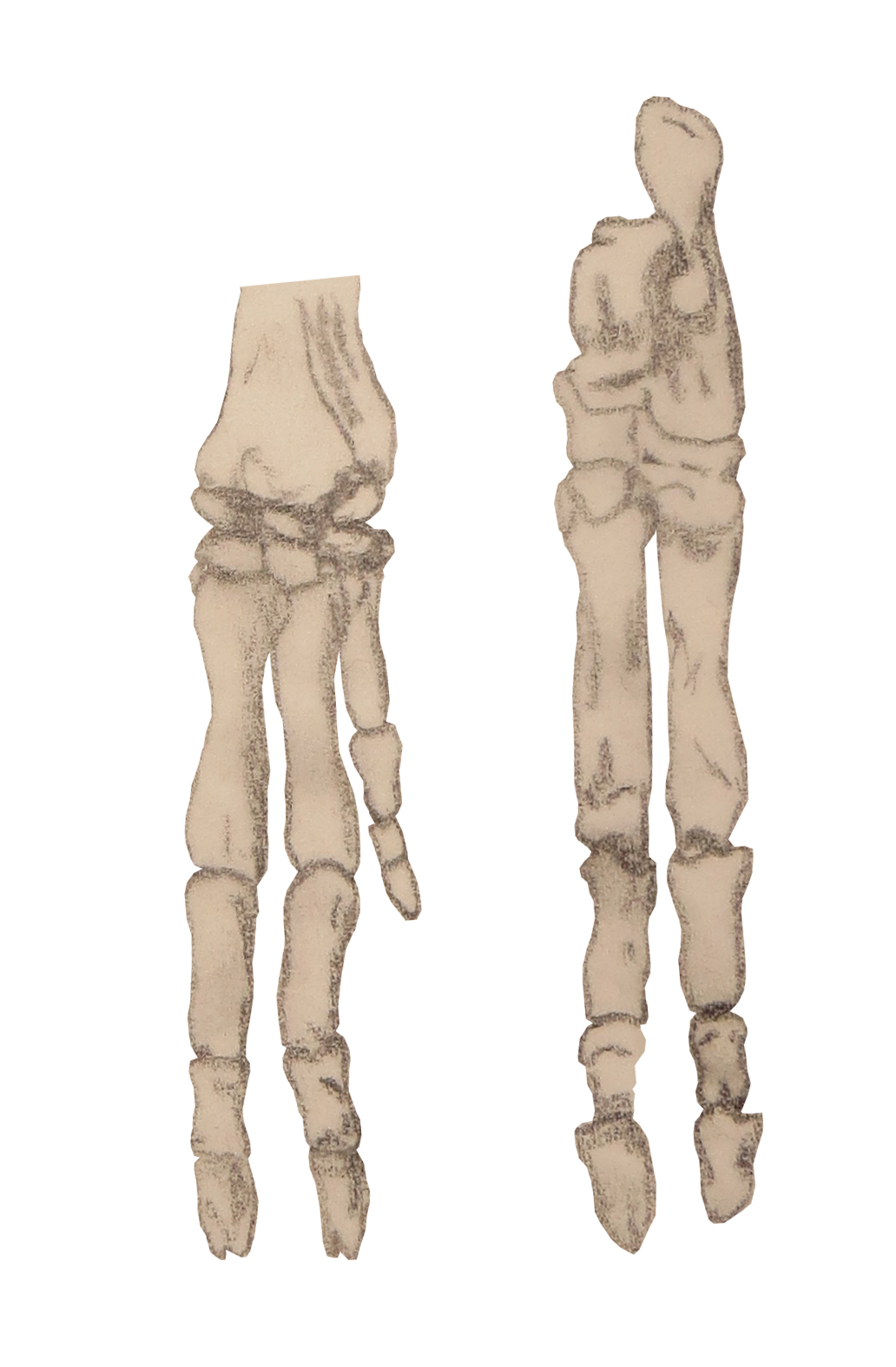
Manus and pes of Miocochilius

Miocochilius fossils in South America
Colombia (M. anapomodus)
Peru (M. anapomodus)
Bolivia (M. federicoi)

The genus Miocochilius was first described by Ruben Arthur Stirton in 1953, based on a nearly complete and numerous incomplete skeletons found in the Honda Group of Colombia. The type species was named M. anomopodus. More fossils of this species were found at La Venta and in the Ipururo Formation in Peru.

The holotype specimen of the small typothere, a cursorial insectivore, had a cerebral hemisphere length of 38 millimetres (1.5 in), canines of 5.5 by 3.0 millimetres (0.22 in × 0.12 in) and a cheekbone of 43.0 by 6.0 millimetres (1.69 in × 0.24 in). The premaxilla measured 6.0 millimetres (0.24 in).

A second species, M. federicoi, was described by Darin A. Croft in 2007 based on a maxilla found in the Honda Group of Bolivia. The species epithet refers to Federico Anaya, a scientist and field collector who has been instrumental in advancing vertebrate paleontology in Bolivia. M. federicoi differs from Eopachyrucos, Santiagorothia, Proargyrohyrax, Archaeophylus and Progaleopithecus in having extremely high crowned teeth. The described species is differentiated from the Chasicoan to Colloncuran genus Protypotherium in having more open lingual enamel folds, variable presence of small median lobe on upper molars, and molars with more rounded distal lobes. The species also is different than Argyrohyrax in the absence of fossettes on the upper molars. Compared to Cochilius and the Colloncuran Interatherium, Miocochilius federicoi has a longer, low skull. The author inclined to describe the specimen as a separate genus, but finally included the species in Miocochilius.

== Paleoecology ==
Miocochilius shared its habitat with many other mammals, birds, reptiles and amphibians. The Colombian specimens were found in fluvial claystones of the "Monkey Unit", El Líbano sands and clays, San Nicolas Unit, Upper Red Bed and the Baraya Volcanic Member of the Villavieja Formation and the Cerro Gordo Member of the La Victoria Formation of the Honda Group. Fossils of Miocochilius, the most abundant mammal at La Venta, were found alongside the primates Mohanamico hershkovitzi, Neosaimiri fieldsi and Stirtonia tatacoensis, the rodents Scleromys colombianus, S. schurmanni, Drytomomys aequatorialis, Neoreomys huilensis, Eodolichotis maddeni, Rhodanodolichotis antepridiana, Prodolichotis guerreroi and P. pridiana, the ant eater Neotamandua borealis, the bat Notonycteris magdalenensis, the pampatheriid Scirrotherium hondaensis, other notoungulates Pericotoxodon platignathus, Huilatherium pluripicatum, the sea cow Potamosiren magdalenensis, the sparassodonts Hondadelphys fieldsi and Lycopsis longirostrus, the litoptern Megadolodus molariformis and the ground sloth Magdalenabradys confusum. The assemblage also contained the crocodylians Purussaurus neivensis and Charactosuchus fieldsi, the caiman lizard Dracaena colombiana, and the turtles Geochelone and Podocnemis pritchardi.

The fossils belong to the Xenastrapotherium kraglievichi-Granastrapotherium snorki assemblage at La Venta. Based on vegetational and grazer diversity analysis of the La Venta fauna, it has been suggested the ecosystem resembled more that of Africa and Asia than of the modern Neotropics.

The Peruvian specimen was collected in a conglomerate, deposited in a storm-dominated coastal to fluvial environment, alternatively described as lacustrine and paludal, at the Fitzcarrald Arch in the Ucayali River basin of Amazonian Peru. Other mammals found in the same location were the toxodont Pericotoxodon cf. platignathus, glyptodonts Boreostemma and Parapropalaehoplophorus septentrionalis, the ground sloth Urumacotherium and rodent Drytomomys cf. aequatorialis.

The Bolivian species M. federicoi was discovered in fluvial silty claystones of the Honda Group, dated on the basis of ^{40}K/^{40}Ar analysis at 12.83 ± 0.11 Ma and 11.96 ± 0.11 Ma. The fossil was accompanied by a large variety of rodents, sparassodonts, litopterns, notoungulates and the glyptodonts Hapalops angustipalatus, Hiskatherium saintandrei and Propalaehoplophorus andinus. In total, 30 different genera of mammals are described from the Quebrada Honda fauna, while 68 genera were described at La Venta.

== See also ==
- Allalmeia
- Campanorco
- Interatherium
- Protypotherium
