= Antofagastia =

Antofagastia Temporal range: Late Eocene ~36–34 Ma

Scientific classification
- Kingdom: Animalia
- Phylum: Chordata
- Class: Mammalia
- Order: †Notoungulata
- Family: †Interatheriidae
- Genus: †Antofagastia; García-López & Babot, 2014
- Species: †A. turneri

Binomial name
- †Antofagastia turneri García-López & Babot, 2014

Extinct genus of Notoungulate

Antofagastia is an extinct genus of Notoungulate, belonging to the family Interatheriidae. It lived during the Late Eocene in what is today South America.

== Description ==
This small animal was vaguely similar to a marmot or a nutria. It was characterized by its low-crowned (brachydont) premolars and molars, with a narrow lingual groove and small pits in the upper molars. The cheekbone, as in typical interatheriids, was characterized by the exclusion of the jugal bone from the orbit, due to the zygomatic process of the maxilla and the presence of a small descending process.

It was much smaller than contemporary interatheres such as Notopithecus and Transpithecus.

== Classification ==
Antofagastia was a basal representative of the Interatheriidae, a family of typothere notoungulates that diversify during the Oligocene and Miocene. Antofagastia seems to occupy a position more derived than Notopithecus and Transpithecus, but less derived than Santiagorothia and Protypotherium.

Antofagastia was first described in 2014, based on fossil remains found in the Geste Formation, from the Late Eocene of Northwestern Argentina. It was related to Punapithecus.
