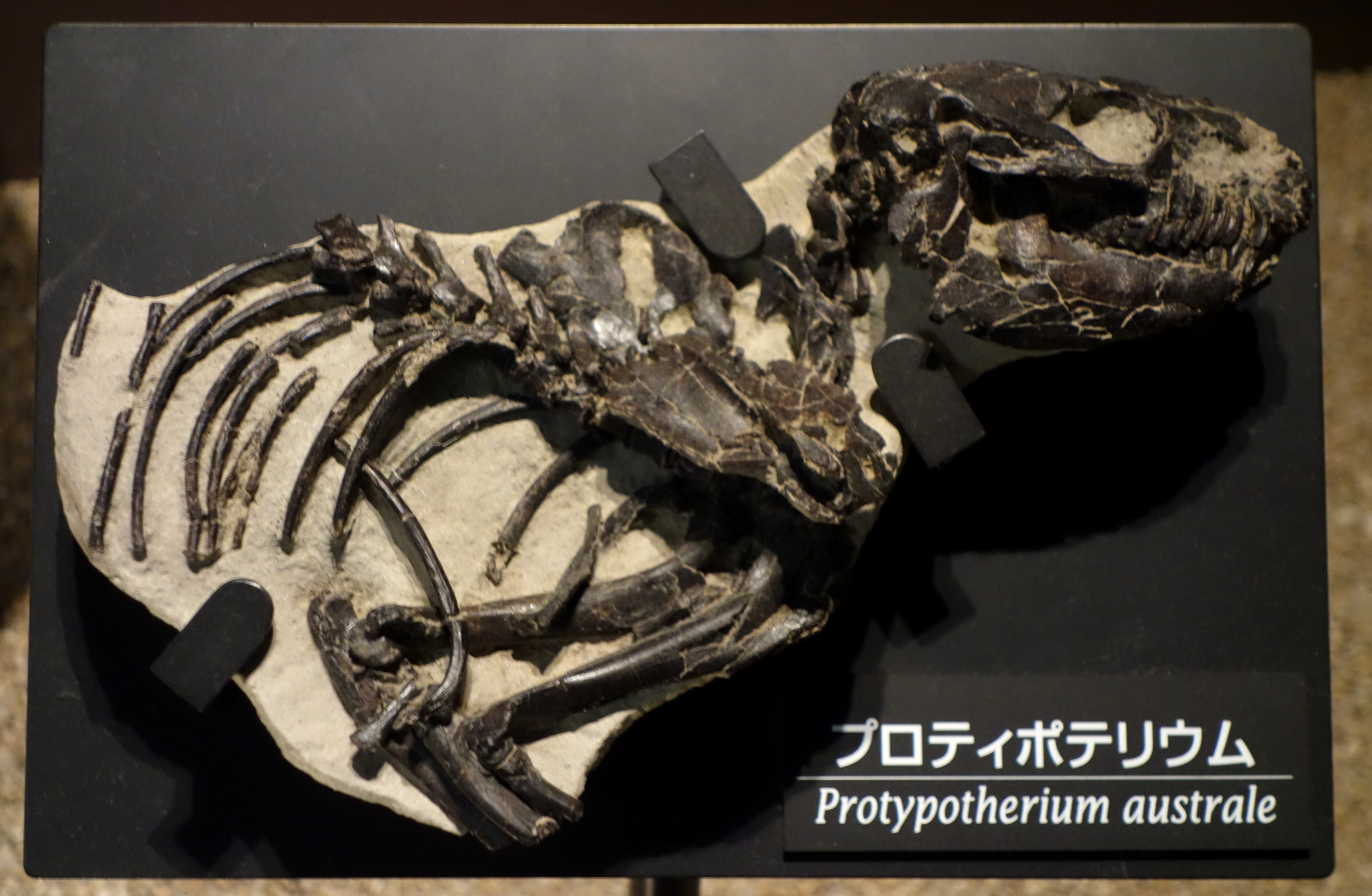
- Fossil of P. australe. Exhibit in the National Museum of Nature and Science, Tokyo, Japan

Scientific classification
- Kingdom: Animalia
- Phylum: Chordata
- Class: Mammalia
- Infraclass: Placentalia
- Order: †Notoungulata
- Family: †Interatheriidae
- Subfamily: †Interatheriinae
- Genus: †Protypotherium; Ameghino 1882

Type species
- †Protypotherium antiquum Moreno 1882

Species
- See text

Synonyms
- Toxodontophanus Moreno 1882

= Protypotherium =

Protypotherium Temporal range: Late Oligocene Early-Late Miocene (Deseadan-Huayquerian) ~29–6.8 Ma

Extinct genus of notoungulates

Protypotherium is an extinct genus of notoungulate mammals native to South America during the Oligocene and Miocene epochs. A number of closely related animals date back further, to the Eocene. Fossils of Protypotherium have been found in the Deseadan Fray Bentos Formation of Uruguay, Muyu Huasi and Nazareno Formations of Bolivia, Cura-Mallín and Río Frías Formations of Chile, and Santa Cruz, Salicas, Ituzaingó, Aisol, Cerro Azul, Cerro Bandera, Cerro Boleadoras, Chichinales, Sarmiento and Collón Curá Formations of Argentina.

The taxonomy of the genus and the species within has a long and complicated history. Other genera of interatheriids such as Epipatriarchus, Eudiastatus, and Toxdontophanus, have been named, but no complete specimens exist, making comparison and classification difficult. Most modern scientists consider these genera to be junior synonyms of Protypotherium, and it is thought to contain the following species; P. australe, P. praerutilum, P. antiquum, P. altum, P. attenuatum, P. claudum, P. colloncurensis, P. diastematum, P. distinctum, P. minutum, P. endiadys, P. sinclairi, and P. concepcionensis. The most completely known species is P. australe, so most reconstructions of the genus are based on it.

== Taxonomy ==
Protypotherium was a typical representative of the Interatheriidae, a group of typotherian notoungulates with rodent-like appearances, usually with slender forms. The genus has a wide stratigraphic and geographic distribution, around 29 million years. Fossils assigned to Protypotherium have been found in numerous localities in Argentina, Bolivia, Chile, and Uruguay. The oldest occurrence of Protypotherium dates back to the Late Oligocene (Deseadan) Fray Bentos Formation of Uruguay.

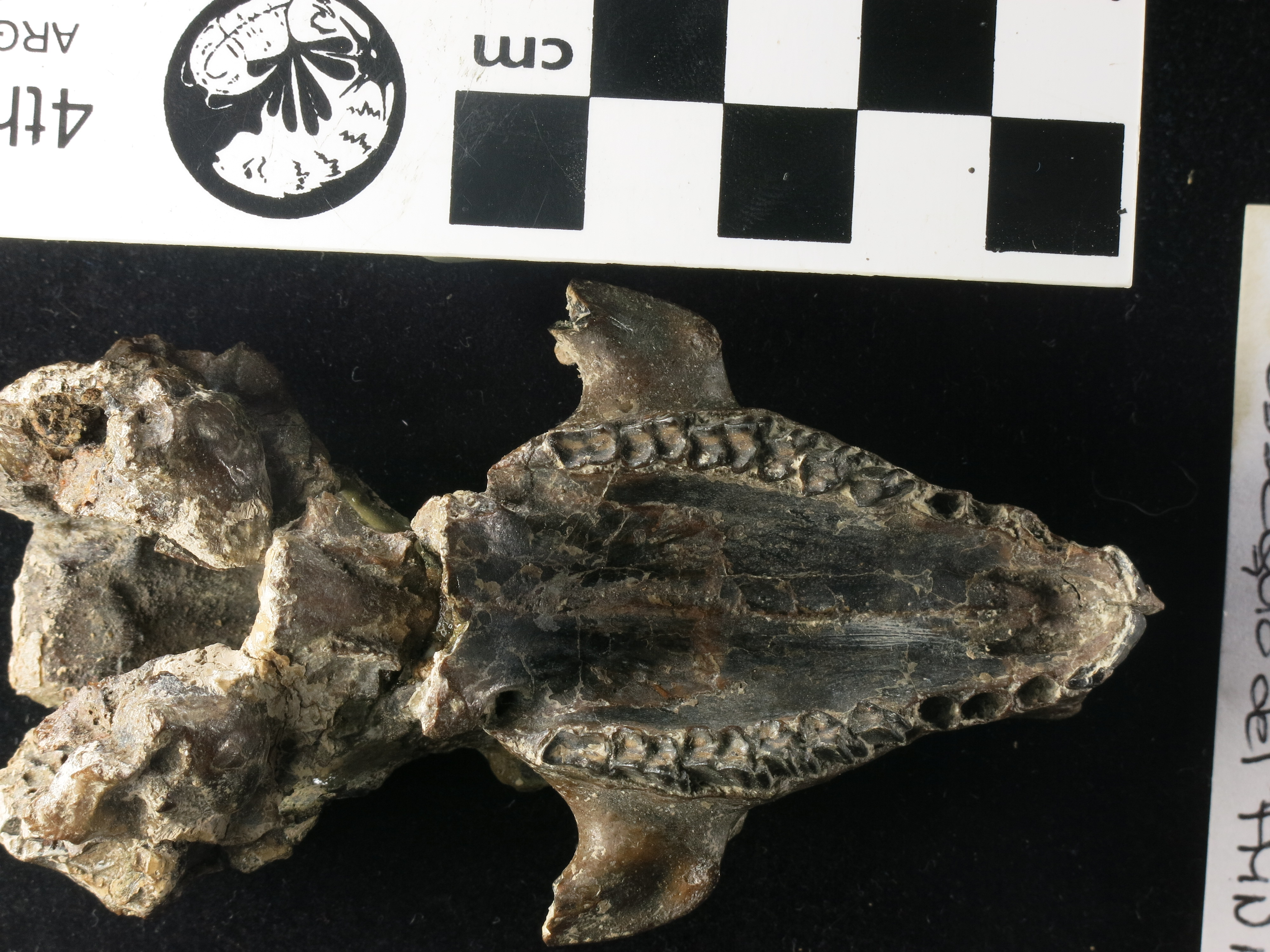
Cranium of Protypotherium praerutilum

The genus Protypotherium was first described in 1882 by Florentino Ameghino, based on fossil remains found in the Ituzaingó Formation in Entre Ríos Province, Argentina, in soils dating from the Late Miocene. The type species is Protypotherium antiquum. Another well-known species is P. australe, also from the Santa Cruz Formation, but several other species have been attributed to this genus, such as P. altum, P. attenuatum, P. claudum, P. colloncurensis, P. diastematum, P. distinctum, P. endiadys, P. minutum, P. praerutilum, and P. sinclairi, all found in various localities in Argentina in Lower and Middle Miocene deposits. A species from Chile, P. concepcionensis was described in 2019.

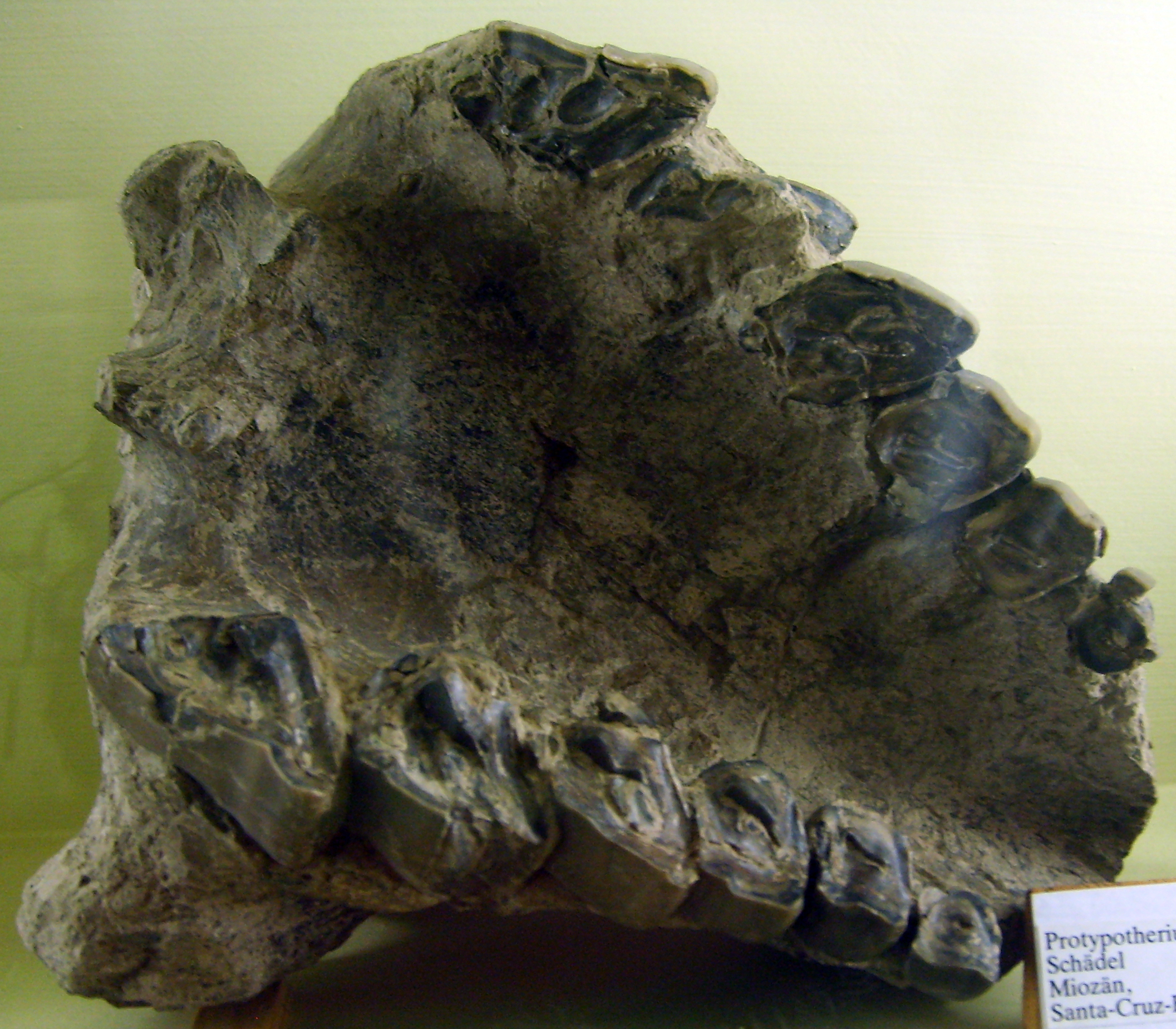
Upper jaw of Protypotherium australe from below

Protypotherium was a rather specialized member of the interatheriids, akin to the bizarre Miocochilius; these two forms, according to a 2017 study, formed a monophyletic derived clade within the family Interatheriidae. In the same study, it is indicated that the species P. australe would be the most basal known species of the genus and may be ancestral to the other species of Protypotherium and the genus Miocochilius. In spite of its name, Protypotherium was not an ancestor of "Typotherium", a genus that is now considered to be a synonym of Mesotherium, another notoungulate belonging to another family, the Mesotheriidae.

The following cladogram of the Interatheriinae is based on Vera et al. 2017, showing the position of Protypotherium.

- Interatheriinae
  - Eopachyrucos pliciferus
  - - Santiagorothia chiliensis
    - - Federicoanaya sallaensis
      - - Brucemacfaddenia boliviensis
        - - Archaeophylus patrius
          - Progaleopithecus tournoueri
          - Argyrohyrax proavus
          - - Interatherium robustum
            - Cochilius volvens
          - - Protypotherium australe
            - - Protypotherium endiadys
              - - Protypotherium distinctum
                - Protypotherium sinclairi
                - Miocochilius federicoi
                - Miocochilius anamopodus
                - - Protypotherium minutum
                  - Protypotherium colloncurensis

== Species ==
The following species of Protypotherium have been described:

- P. altum Ameghino 1891
- P. antiquum Ameghino 1882
- P. attenuatum Ameghino 1887
- P. australe Moreno 1882
- P. claudum Ameghino 1889
- P. colloncurensis Vera et al. 2017
- P. diastematum Ameghino 1891
- P. distinctum Cabrera & Kraglievich 1931
- P. endiadys Roth 1898
- P. minutum Cabrera & Kraglievich 1931
- P. praerutilum Ameghino 1887
- P. sinclairi Kramarz et al. 2015
- P. concepcionensis Solórzano et al. 2019

== Description ==
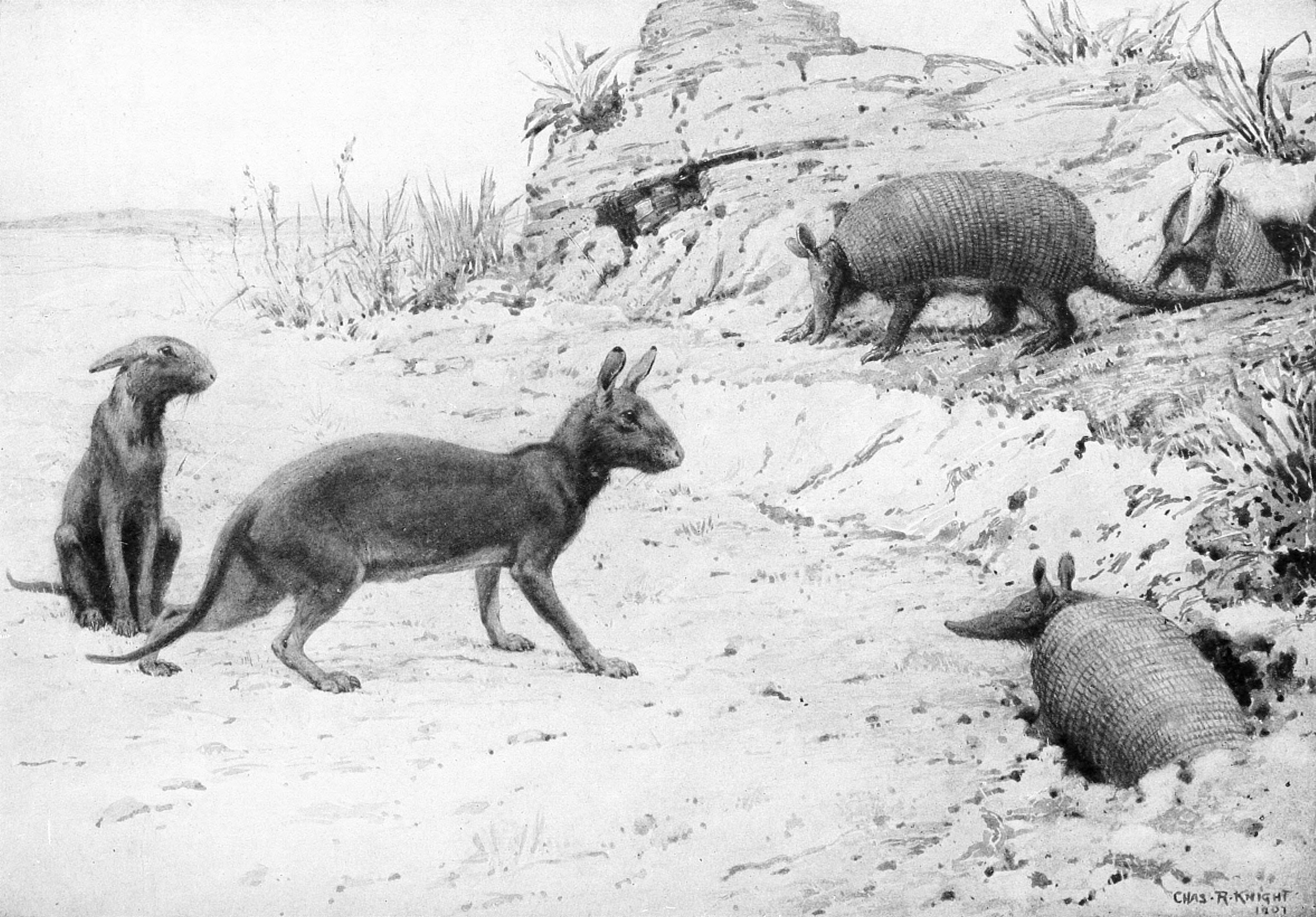
Restoration of P. australe and Stegotherium tesselatum

Protypotherium was slightly larger than a rabbit, measuring about 40 centimetres (1.3 ft) in length. The body and legs as well as the tail of this animal were relatively long, while its neck was short. It probably resembled a rodent, possessing slender limbs with four, digitigrade clawed feet. Its rat-like skull contained a set of 44 unspecialized teeth.

From the shape of its claws, Protypotherium would have been adept at digging and likely took over the burrows of other animals.

=== Skull and dentition ===
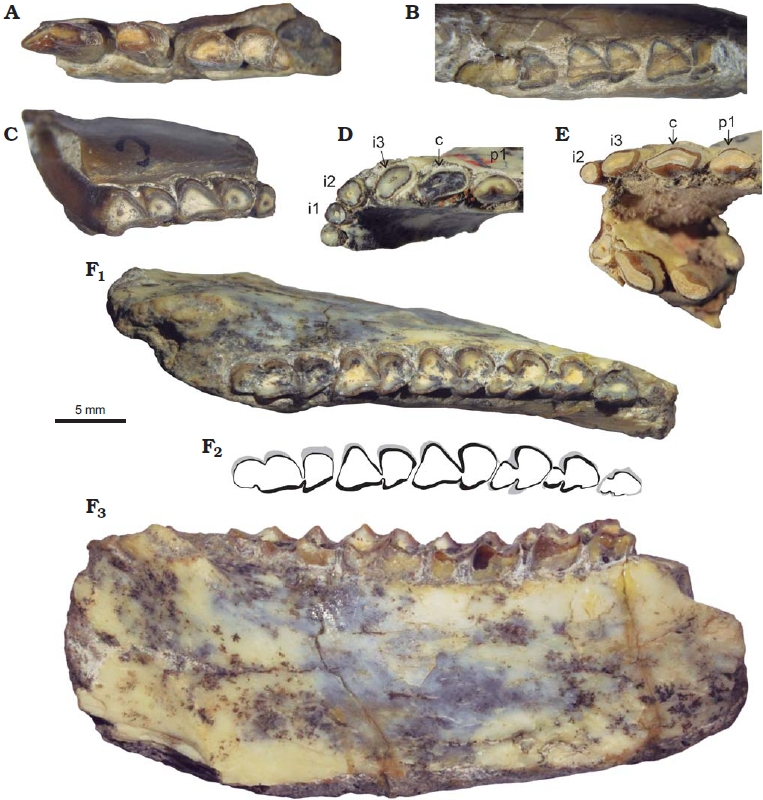
Lower dentition of Protypotherium endiadys

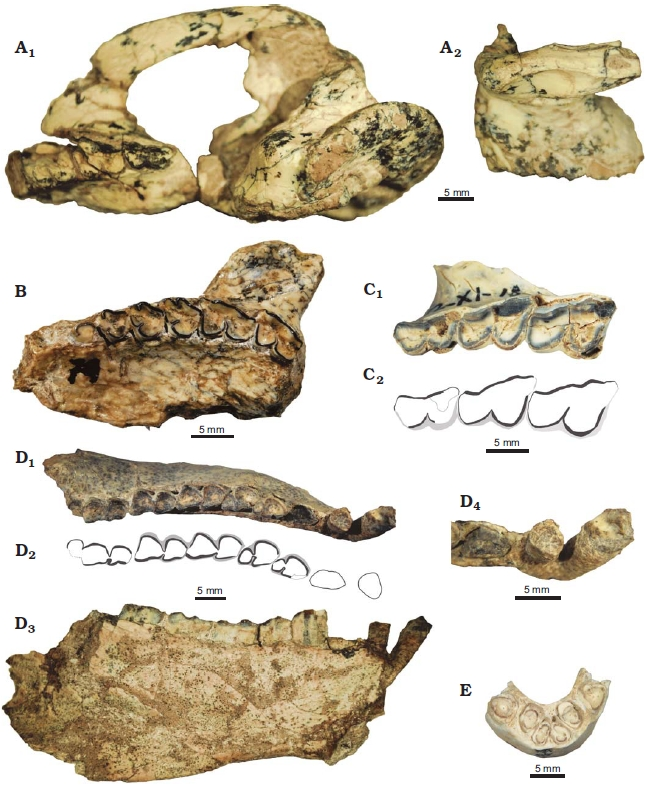
Lower and upper dentition of Protypotherium colloncurensis

The skull of Protypotherium was about halfway up the cranial vault, was slightly descending in the anterior part; the posterior part, on the other hand, lowered abruptly, in contrast to similar forms such as Cochilius (whose cranial vault was not inclined). The orbit was in a nearly median position, very open posteriorly, and the nasal bones were very advanced. The orbital arch was robust and was the direct extension of the lambdoid ridges. The maxillary bone alone formed the lower margin of the skull. At the back of the skull, the squamous bone and mastoid were highly developed. Seen from above, the skull had an oval outline but narrowed sharply at the beginning of the snout. The temporal fossa continued backward in a deep reinforcement between the lambdoid and sagittal ridges. The auditory region was characterized by a hypotympanic sinus much smaller than the tympanic cavity. In some species, the inner wall of the tympanic membrane was thick and filled with a fine spongy tissue. The epitympanic sinus was of medium size. The two branches of the mandible were firmly joined in the anterior part; the posterior part of the mandible was very elevated.

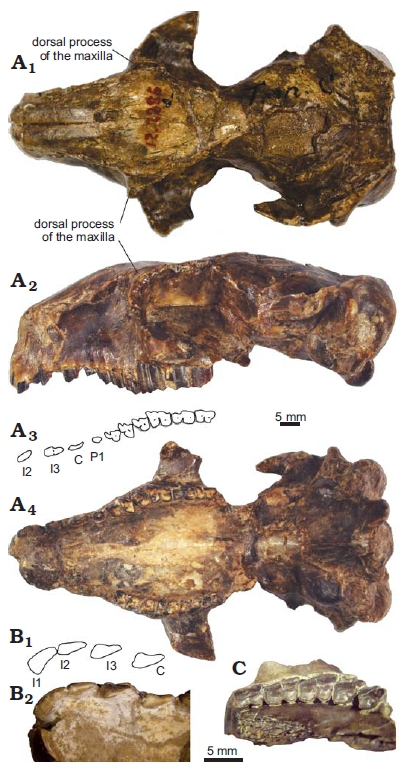
Skull and upper dentition of Protypotherium endiadys

The dentition is complete, with the mandible having 44 teeth and no diastema. The upper incisors were rooted and provided with enamel on the outer surface. The canines were incisor-shaped, while the premolars had weak roots. The molars had two ribs on the outer wall. An internal groove divided the tooth into two almost equal lobes. An unworn molar showed an ectoloph, two convex inner crescents, and a ridge departing from the ectoloph. The anterior margin of each crescent joined the ectoloph. The lower incisors were divided longitudinally by a deep groove and resembled those of present-day hyraxes. The teeth were partially overlapping: one molar covered the posterior-external margin of the previous molar. An opposite outer and inner groove divided the molars into two lobes; the posterior lobe was shorter. A slight anterior-internal groove disappeared over time as tooth wear progressed.

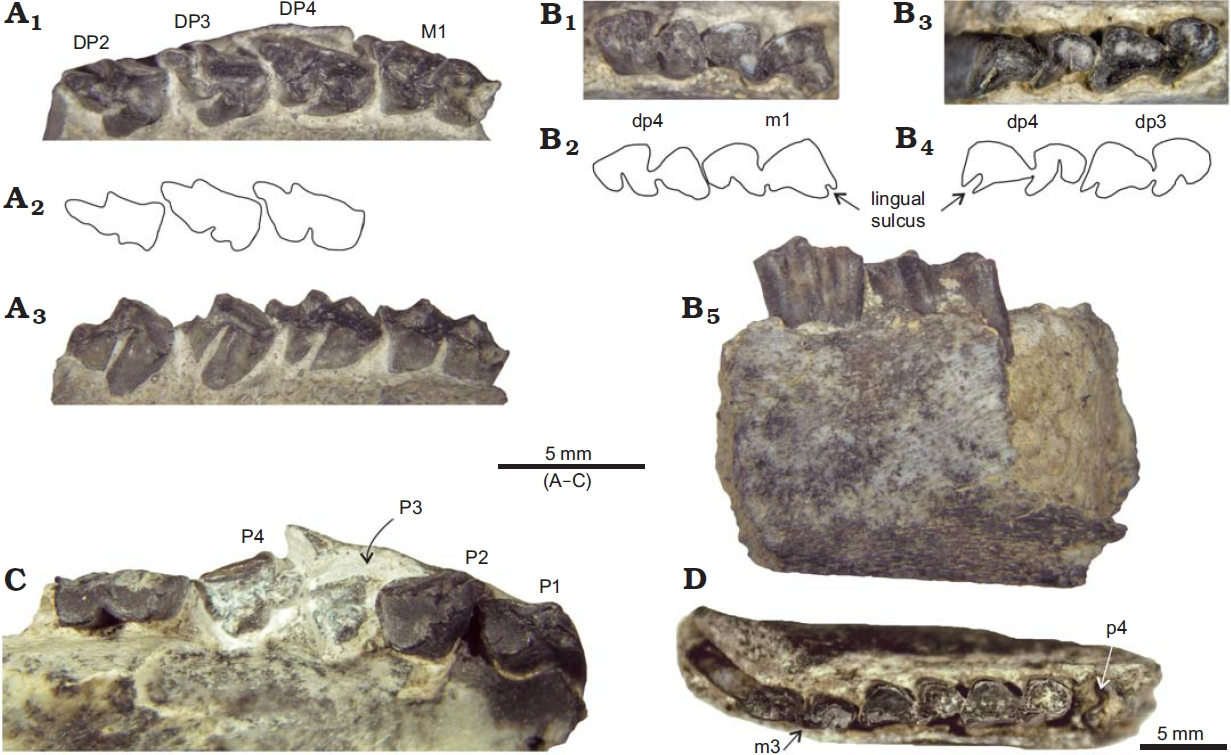
Dentition detail of Protypotherium endiadys

The upper incisors of Protypotherium are characterized by a three-layered schmelzmuster represented by outer radial enamel. The prism diameter is ~6 μm. The Hunter-Schreger bands are thin (20–50 μm thick) and oblique. The interprismatic matrix forms closed coats near the outer enamel service and interrow sheets near the enamel dentine junction, and is intermediate to modified in the Hunter-Schreger bands. Lower incisors of Protypotherium are characterized by a one-layered schmelzmuster with Hunter-Schreger bands. Prism diameter is ~6 μm. Hunter-Schreger Bands are generally oblique and steady, even if they present a low decussation on both sections and are less discernible on some transverse sections. The interprismatic matrix forms closed coats in the entire thickness, but it is also slightly anastomosing near the enamel dentine junction. The thickness of its dentition suggest that it was a grazer, eating mainly grass.

Protypotherium has euhypsodont (well high-crowned) premolars and molars, and premolariform premolars. The upper molars have a lingual sulcus that separates the protolophs from the metalophs. The third and fourth premolars have a sub-triangular shape, with the mesio-distal length shorter than the labio-lingual breadth and a smaller size than the first and second molars. The first and third incisors are compact (i.e. lacking spaces between the teeth) and are imbricated another mesiodistally. The second premolar has a shorter talonid than the trigonid. The third and fourth premolars are relatively smaller than the first and second molars. The first and third molars have sub-triangular trigonids, while the first and second molars have longer talonids than the trigonids.

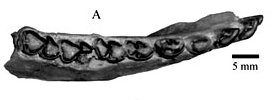
Mandibular fragment of Protypotherium sinclairi

Compared with the related Interatherium and Cochilius, Protypotherium had well-differentiated third and fourth premolars compared to molars, and numerous other dental features. In contrast to Miocochilius, moreover, Protypotherium possessed the canine-shaped lower first premolar and shorter lower third molar.

The species Protypotherium sinclairi can be distinguished from other species of Protypotherium by its dentition, with all teeth having a thick cementum covering. The third and fourth premolar both have a shorter anteroposterior diameter of the talonid than the trigonid, while the first and second premolars are short and non-molariform. The teeth of this species are smaller than those of P. australe, but larger than those of P. praerutilum and P. attenuatum, all of which are Santacrucian in age. The posterior lower premolars show proportionally larger buccolingual diameter of the talonid than those in the Santacrucian species.

=== Postcranial skeleton ===
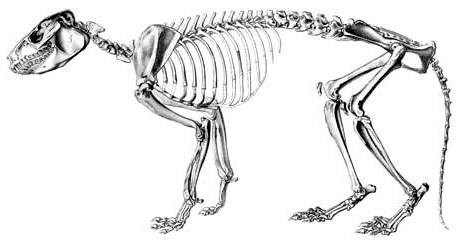
Reconstructed skeleton

The skeleton of Protypotherium is well known, especially regarding the species Protypotherium australe. Fifteen dorsal vertebrae, seven lumbar vertebrae and five sacral vertebrae were probably present. The tail was long, with at least eighteen vertebrae.

The scapula possessed a slightly convex coracoid margin. The scapular spine was tall and narrow, with a small apophysis of the acromion and a large metacromion. The humerus was very stout in the proximal region, with two low tuberosities; the distal end was enlarged, with the entepicondyle developed and provided with a large foramen. The radius was strongly curved antero-posteriorly and rather gracile; the ulna, on the other hand, was curved laterally. The hand was tetradactylous, as opposed to the related Miocochilius, which had only three fingers, two of which were functional, with an alternating structure of the carpus and relationships between the metacarpals. The weight was discharged between the second and third metacarpals, which were almost equal in length, while the fourth was shorter and the fifth was much reduced. The scaphoid bone had a strong articulation for the radius and rested on the greater trochanter and the trapezoid. In the outer part, the scaphoid articulated with the lunar bone by means of a small facet of the apophysis related to the great bone. The lunate bone was in contact distally with the great bone and the hamate, and laterally it was in contact with the cuneiform bone via a large surface. The joints of the first phalanges were limited to the plantar and distal surfaces. The phalanges nail joints were laterally compressed and provided with a small incision at the end.

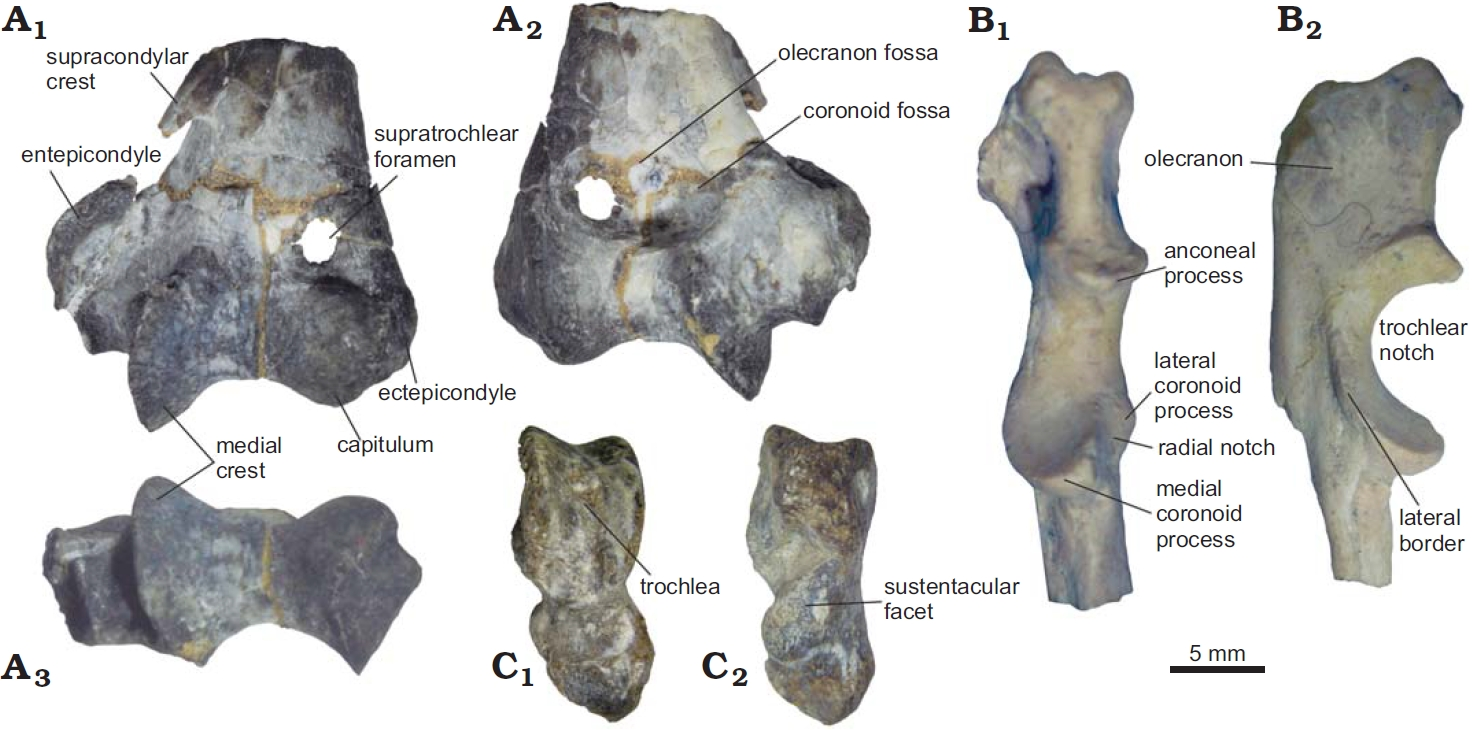
Post-cranial bones of P. endiadys

The ischium was broad posteriorly, and the pubical area was small. The femur was straight and somewhat flattened anteroposteriorly. The greater trochanter slightly exceeded the articular head, while the third trochanter was well developed and in a fairly proximal position. The condyles were large. The tibia and fibula were usually separated, but sometimes distal co-ossification was present. The distal joint of the tibia was divided by a prominent ridge into two equal cavities. The fibula was thin. The trochlea of the astragalus was long and medium deep; the ridges of the talus were equal to each other, the neck long and the head globular. The calcaneus did not articulate with the navicular bone and had a large facet for the fibula. The phalanges possessed the same structure as those of the hand, but were larger. It is likely that the feet of Protypotherium were digitigrade.

== Paleobiology ==
Protypotherium was mainly a herbivore, but it is possible that Protypotherium fed occasionally on carrion as well. The dental microwear of Protypotherium is consistent with the interpretation that it was an herbivore and is indicative of the fact that its predominant feeding mode was browsing. The body mass of P. australe makes it likely to have been a browser, though grass may have nonetheless formed some component of its diet. The legs clearly show robust nail phalanges, thanks to which the animal could dig burrows or modify those abandoned by other animals.

A 2021 study concerning numerous fossils of the teeth of various species of Protypotherium showed that there is a trend in the preservation of tooth pattern, increase in size and decrease in number of species over time. This could be correlated with a global trend of cooling temperatures, indicating a deterioration of paleoenvironmental conditions during the Miocene. There also appears to have been a latitude shift in the distributional range of these animals: from Lower Miocene Patagonia to northern areas of South America towards the end of the Miocene.

== Paleoenvironment ==
Fossils of Protypotherium have been found in various fossiliferous stratigraphic units in South America. Several specimens come from the Santa Cruz Formation in the Austral Basin in southern Patagonia, Argentina, with other finds from the Cerro Azul, Cerro Boleadoras, Ituzaingó, Cerro Bandera, Chichinales, Collón Curá Formations, and the Sarmiento Formations of the Colorado, Austral, Paraná, Neuquén, Cañadón Asfalto, and Golfo San Jorge Basins, as well as the Aisol and Salicas Formations of the same country. Furthermore, fossil finds of Protypotherium have been found in other countries, such as the Fray Bentos Formation of Uruguay, also in the Paraná Basin, the Muyu Huasi Formation of the Muyu Huasi Basin in Bolivia, the Nazareno Formation in the same country, of the Tupiza Basin, and the Cura-Mallín Formation of the Cura Mallín Basin of Argentina and Chile and the Río Frías Formation of the Magallanes Basin in Chile.

In the Chichinales Formation, which is known for its local mammal fauna, Protypotherium would have coexisted with astrapotheres, the notoungulates Cochilius volvens, Colpodon, Hegetotheriopsis sulcatus and Hegetotherium, the litoptern Cramauchenia, the rodents Australoprocta, Caviocricetus, Eoviscaccia, and Willidewu esteparius, the armadillos Proeutatus and Stenotatus, and the sparassodont Cladosictis. Bird remains from the formation are comparatively poor. A part of a tibiotarsus has previously been classified as an undetermined species of psilopterine phorusrhacid. Other birds include an undetermined wading bird, Opisthodactylus horacioperezi, a species of rhea, and Patagorhacos, a phorusrhacid. During the Miocene the area likely consisted of open but wooded environment with temperate climate and a proximity to freshwater.

The Sarmiento Formation has provided a wide assemblage of mammals, consisting of pyroclastic deposits in an arid desert environment. Among these mammals were the astrapotheres Astrapotherium and Parastrapotherium, the fellow notoungulates Argyrohippus, Cochilius, Colpodon, Interatherium and Pachyrukhos, the litopterns Cramauchenia, Lambdaconus, Paramacrauchenia, Proheptaconus, Prolicaphrium, Pternoconius, Tetramerorhinus and Theosodon, the xenarthrans Hapaloides, Holomegalonyx, Nematherium, Peltephilus, Proeutatus, Proschismotherium, Prozaedyus, Stegotherium, and Stenotatus, the metatherians Acyon, Acrocyon, Arctodictis, Borhyaena, Cladosictis, Palaeothentes, and Sipalocyon, the rodents Acarechimys Acaremys, Caviocricetus, Eosteiromys, Eoviscaccia, Hypsosteiromys, Neoreomys, Paradelphomys, Parasteiromys, Perimys, Prospaniomys, Prostichomys, Protacaremys, Protadelphomys, Sarremys and Soriamys, and the primates Homunculus, Mazzonicebus and Tremacebus. The late-surviving meridiolestidan Necrolestes was also present.

Multiple species of Protypotherium lived during the Early Miocene in the Santa Cruz Formation of Argentina, which preserves mostly a coastal environment, but also forested and grassland regions. The area had little rainfall, so forests developed around lakes and rivers, giving Santa Cruz a diverse environment. During the Miocene, the climate was similar to those of the coasts of Chile with semi-temperate forests and oceanic winds. Grasslands began spreading into Argentina during the Miocene, though much of inner Patagonia was still arid with small rainforests in between. Large, herbivorous, South American ungulates such as the astrapothere Astrapotherium, the toxodont notoungulates Adinotherium, Homalodotherium and Nesodon shared the niche of low browsers, along with the litopterns Adianthus, Anisolophus, Diadiaphorus, Tetramerorhinus, Theosodon, and Thoatherium, with the rabbit-like interatheres such as Interatherium and the hegetotheres Hegetotherium and Pachyrukhos being frugivorous. Both mammalian and avian carnivores inhabited the area, the largest being the phorusrhacid Phorusrhacos. Marsupials also lived in the region, including the large carnivorous sparassodonts Borhyaena and the smaller sparassodonts Acyon, Cladosictis, and Sipalocyon. Xenarthrans in the Santa Cruz Formation were fairly common, such as the ground sloths Analcimorphus, Analcitherium, Eucholoeops, Hapalops, Hyperleptus, Nematherium, Megalonychotherium, Planops, Prepotherium, Schismotherium, Trematherium, and Xyophorus, and the armadillos Cochlops, Eucinepeltus, Proeutatus, Propalaehoplophorus, Prozaedyus, Stegotherium, and Stenotatus. In addition, fossils of rodents, such as Acarechimys, Acaremys, Adelphomys, Eocardia, Neoreomys, Perimys, Pliolagostomus, Prolagostomus, Schistomys, Scleromys, Spaniomys, and Stichomys are also known. There were also primates found in the formation, such as Carlocebus and Homunculus.

The Collón Curá Formation and the Colloncuran age of South America represent a time when more open environments with reduced plant covering predominated, similar to semiarid and temperate to warm, dry woodlands or bushlands. The open environment allowed more cursorial (adapted for running) and large animals to occur, contrasting with the earlier conditions during the late Early Miocene, with its well-developed forests with tree-dwelling animals. Forests would then have been restricted to valleys of the cordillera mountain ranges, with few tree-dwelling species. This change happened progressively during the earlier Friasian stage. The transition towards more arid landscapes would have happened simultaneously with climate changes that corresponded to the Middle Miocene Climate Transition, a global cooling event which had a drying effect on continents.

The Collón Curá Formation of Argentina has provided a wide assemblage of mammals, including at least 24 taxa such as the xenarthrans Megathericulus, Prepotherium, Prozaedyus, and Paraeucinepeltus, the notoungulates Hegetotherium, Interatherium, and Pachyrukhos, the astrapothere Astrapotherium, the sparassodonts Patagosmilus and Cladosictis, the marsupial Abderites, the primate Proteropithecia, and rodents such as Maruchito, Protacaremys, Neoreomys, and Prolagostomus. In addition to the mammals that characterize sediments of this age, there are also a few fossils of birds, reptiles, amphibians, and fish.
