= Ankonetta =

Ankonetta Temporal range: Early Miocene (Santacrucian)

Scientific classification
- Kingdom: Animalia
- Phylum: Chordata
- Class: Aves
- Order: Anseriformes
- Family: Anatidae
- Genus: †Ankonetta; Cenizo & Agnolín, 2010
- Species: †A. larriestrai

Binomial name
- †Ankonetta larriestrai Cenizo & Agnolín, 2010

Extinct genus of birds

Ankonetta is an extinct genus of mid-sized anatid birds that lived during the Miocene. Its holotype was found in the Early Miocene (Santacrucian), Santa Cruz Formation in Argentina. The type species is A. larriestrai.

== Etymology ==
The genus name is derived from Aónikenk, a group of indigenous Tehuelche-speaking people from Patagonia. Anko means "father" and netta is derived from Greek, meaning "duck". The species epithet refers to Claudio Larriestra, who studied the Pinturas Formation, another important fossiliferous formation of Patagonia.
