= Pseudoacaremys =

Pseudoacaremys Temporal range: Burdigalian

Scientific classification
- Kingdom: Animalia
- Phylum: Chordata
- Class: Mammalia
- Infraclass: Placentalia
- Order: Rodentia
- Family: †Acaremyidae
- Genus: †Pseudoacaremys; Arnal & Vucetich, 2015
- Species: †P. kramarzi

Binomial name
- †Pseudoacaremys kramarzi Arnal & Vucetich, 2015

Extinct genus of rodents

Pseudoacaremys is an extinct genus of acaremyid that lived during the Santacrucian.

== Distribution ==
Pseuodacaremys kramarzi is known from the Santa Cruz Formation of Argentina.
