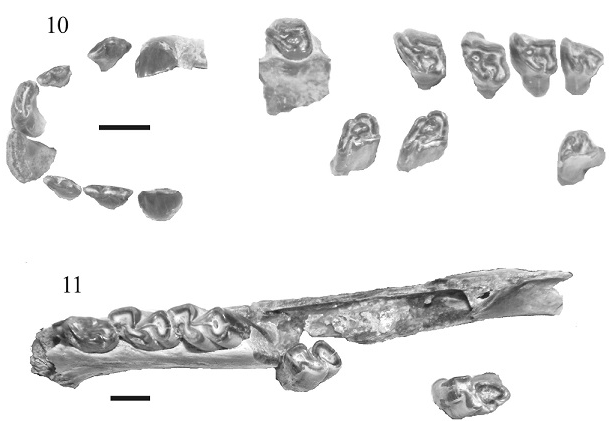
- Dental and mandibular fragment of Proargyrohyrax curanderensis

Scientific classification
- Kingdom: Animalia
- Phylum: Chordata
- Class: Mammalia
- Infraclass: Placentalia
- Order: †Notoungulata
- Family: †Interatheriidae
- Subfamily: †Interatheriinae
- Genus: †Proargyrohyrax; Hitz et al. 2000
- Species: †P. curanderensis

Binomial name
- †Proargyrohyrax curanderensis Hitz et al. 2000

= Proargyrohyrax =

Proargyrohyrax Temporal range: Early-Middle Oligocene (Tinguirirican) ~33.9–31.0 Ma

Extinct genus of notoungulates

Proargyrohyrax is an extinct genus of interatheriine notoungulates that lived from the Early to Middle Oligocene in what is now Argentina. Fossils of this genus have been found in the Sarmiento Formation of Argentina.

== Etymology ==
The genus name, Proargyrohyrax, is derived from "pro", meaning "before", and Argyrohyrax, not only referring to the similarity of the latter genus but also its earlier occurrence. The specific name, curanderensis, refers to the geographic location where it was found, La Curandera.

== Description ==
Proargyrohyrax is a small-sized interatheriid. Proargyrohyrax mostly resembles Santiagorothia, in having a well-developed parastyle that curves in a labial orientation and connects to the moderately developed column of the paracone. In addition, Proargyrohyrax can be distinguished from Santiagorothia in having the upper and lower premolars more molariform, a larger development of the labial fossettes on the upper premolars, and the widened trigonid and talonid on the third premolar.
