= Liptornis =

Liptornis Temporal range: Mid Miocene (Friasian-Laventan) ~15.97–11.6 Ma

Scientific classification
- Kingdom: Animalia
- Phylum: Chordata
- Class: Aves
- Order: Suliformes
- Family: Anhingidae
- Genus: †Liptornis; Ameghino 1894

Species
- L. hesternus Ameghino 1894

Extinct genus of birds

Liptornis is an extinct genus of fossil birds of uncertain affinities. The type species is L. hesternus. It was described by Argentine palaeontologist Florentino Ameghino in 1894 from a large cervical vertebra from the Middle Miocene Santa Cruz Formation of Patagonia. At the time, it was referred to the Pelecanidae, though this is questionable. In his 1933 palaeornithological review, Lambrecht referred it only to the superfamily Sulides without placing it in a family. A later study has suggested family Anhingidae.
