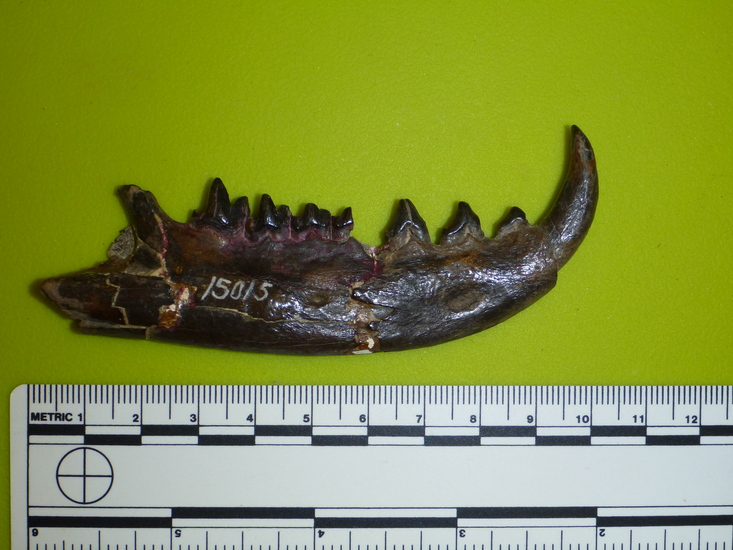
- A lower jaw fragment of Cladosictis lustratus

Scientific classification
- Kingdom: Animalia
- Phylum: Chordata
- Class: Mammalia
- Order: †Sparassodonta
- Family: †Hathliacynidae
- Genus: †Cladosictis; Ameghino 1887

Species
- C. centralis Ameghino 1902; C. defossa (Ameghino 1887); C. patagonica Ameghino 1887

Synonyms
- Agustylus Ameghino 1887; Anatherium Ameghino 1887; Hathliacynus Ameghino 1887; Ictioborus Ameghino 1891

= Cladosictis =

Cladosictis Temporal range: Early-Mid Miocene (Colhuehuapian-Friasian) ~21.0–15.5 Ma

Extinct genus of South American metatherian mammals

Cladosictis (meaning "branch weasel") is an extinct genus of South American metatherian from Patagonia, Argentina (Chichinales, Cerro Bandera, Sarmiento and Santa Cruz Formations) and Chile (Río Frias Formation).

== Description ==
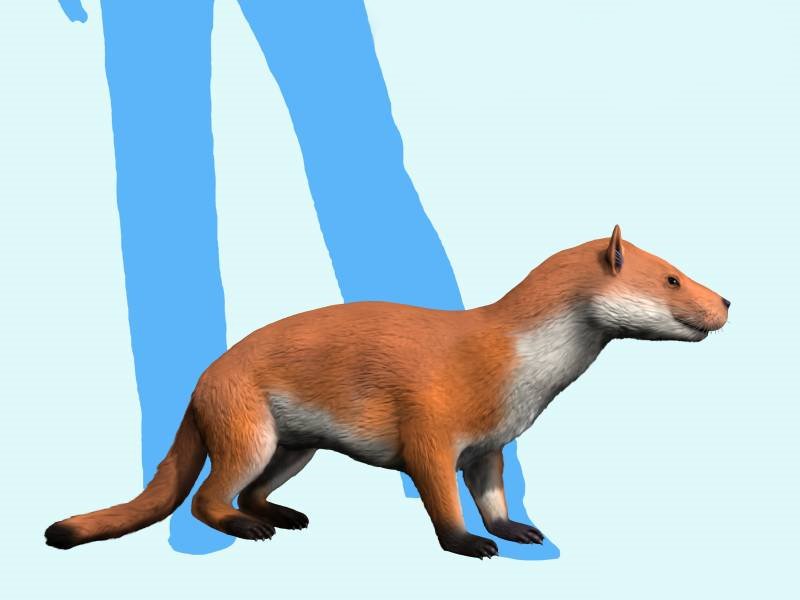
Life restoration of C. patagonica

Cladosictis was a fox-like creature that was around 80 centimetres (2.6 ft) long. Cladosictis probably hunted for eggs and small animals in the low undergrowth, using its low posture for cover. With sharp canines and slicing carnassials, Cladosictis's teeth were similar to those of carnivorans, although the groups were unrelated.

== Palaeobiology ==
The absolute value of the bite force of Cladosictis patagonica was extremely similar to that of the grey fox (Urocyon cinereoargenteus), while its bite force quotient (BFQ) was comparable to that of the red fox (Vulpes vulpes), the Arctic fox (Vulpes lagopus), and the golden jackal (Canis aureus).
