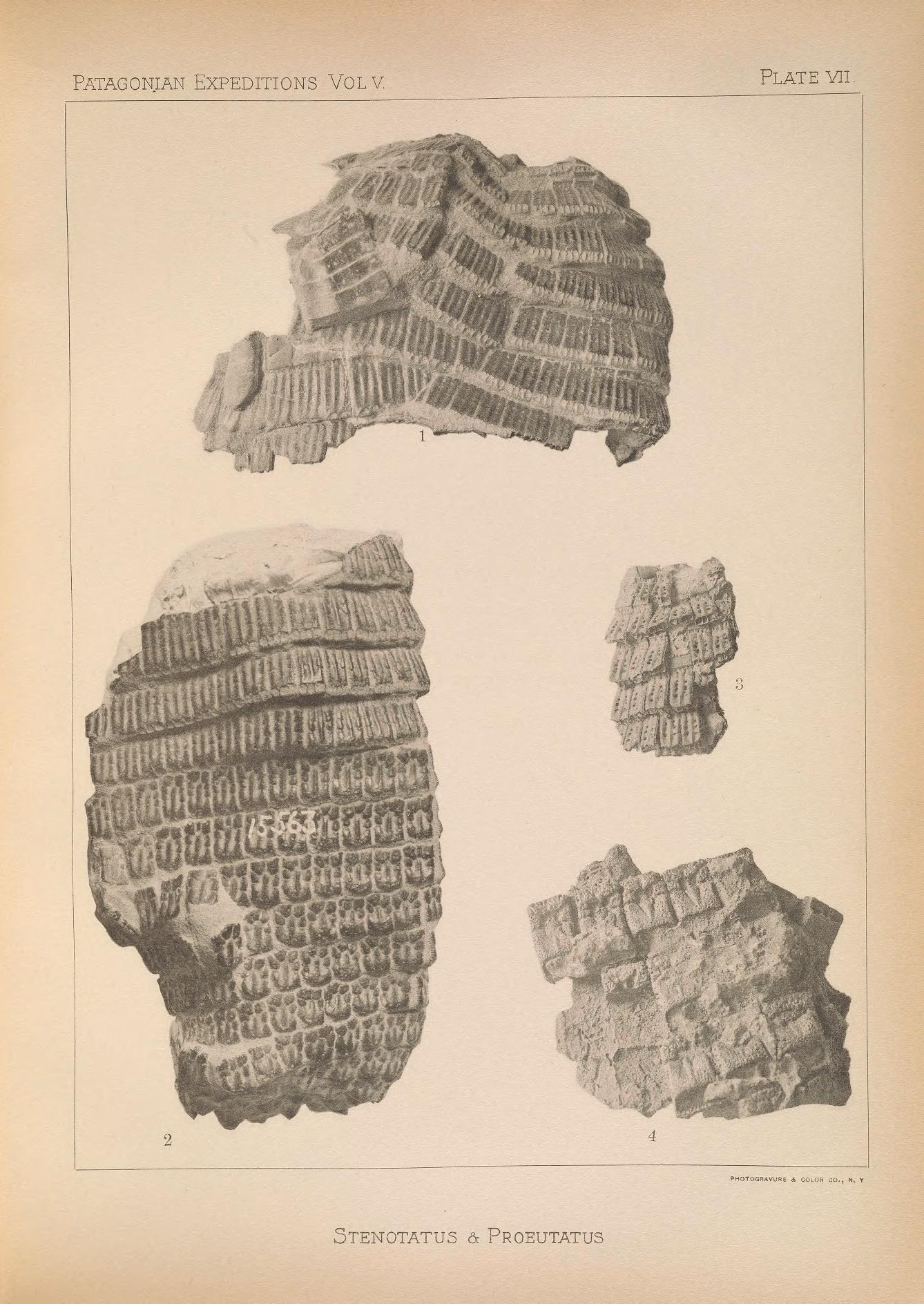
- Fossilized remains of the carapace of Stenotatus and Proeutatus

Scientific classification
- Kingdom: Animalia
- Phylum: Chordata
- Class: Mammalia
- Order: Cingulata
- Family: Dasypodidae
- Genus: †Stenotatus; Ameghino, 1891

Type species
- †Stenotatus patagonicus Ameghino, 1887

Species
- S. centralis Ameghino 1902; S. hesternus Ameghino 1889; S. karaikensis Ameghino 1889; S. patagonicus Ameghino 1887; S. planus Scillato-Yané & Carlini 1998

= Stenotatus =

Stenotatus Temporal range: Early-Late Miocene ~22–11 Ma

Extinct genus of mammals

Stenotatus is an extinct genus of cingulate, belonging to the family Dasypodidae. It lived from the Early to the Late Miocene in South America.

== Description ==
Stenotatus was a small to medium-sized armadillo, not exceeding 4 kilograms (8.8 lb) in weight. It was similar to other Miocene armadillos, from which it was differentiated by its rather long and narrow muzzle, notably the mandible; it had 9 to 10 teeth, simple and oval-shape, with large spaces between the five first teeth. The legs were longer and more specialized than in some of its relatives such as Prozaedyus. The osteoderms composing its mobile armor had three pronounced longitudinal ridges, and it only had a single caudal row of quite narrow piliferous holes.

== Classification ==
The first fossils of this animal were originally described in 1887 under the name Euphractus patagonicus. In 1891, Ameghino described the species Stenotatus karaikensis. The two species were later placed in synonymy, the type species of Stenotatus becoming Stenotatus patagonicus. Other species later attributed to this genus are S. hesternus, S. ornatus, S. centralis and S. planus, all coming from Miocene terrains of Argentina. Fossils attributed to Stenotatus have also been found in Bolivia and Chile.

Stenotatus is one of the most typical armadillos of the South American Miocene; initially considered similar to the extant genus Euphractus, it was later considered close to the genera Proeutatus and Eutatus. It is however still unclear if those two genera constitute a monophyletic group comprising Stenotatus.

== Bibliography ==
- Ameghino, F. 1887. Enumeración sistemática de las especies de mamíferos fósiles coleccionados por Carlos Ameghino en los terrenos eocenos de Patagonia austral y depositados en el Museo La Plata. Boletín del Museo La Plata 1: 1-26.
- Ameghino, F. 1891. Mamíferos y aves fósiles argentinas. Especies nuevas, adiciones y correcciones. Revista Argentina de Historia Natural 1 (4): 240-259.
- Scillato-Yané, G. J. y Carlini, A. A. 1998. Nuevos Xenarthra del Friasense (Mioceno medio) de Argentina. Studia Geologica Salmanticensia 34: 43-67.
- A. G. Kramarz, M. G. Vucetich, A. A. Carlini, M. R. Ciancio, M. A. Abello, C. M. Deschamps, and J. N. Gelfo. 2010. A new mammal fauna at the top of the Gran Barranca sequence and its biochronological significance. In R. H. Madden, A. A. Carlini, M. G. Vucetich, R. F. Kay (eds.), The Paleontology of Gran Barranca: Evolution and Environmental Change through the Middle Cenozoic of Patagonia 264–277
