= Analcimorphus =

Analcimorphus Temporal range: Middle to Late Miocene (Santacrucian) ~18–16 Ma
- Skull of A. giganteus

Scientific classification
- Kingdom: Animalia
- Phylum: Chordata
- Class: Mammalia
- Order: Pilosa
- Suborder: Folivora
- Clade: †Megatheria
- Genus: †Analcimorphus; Ameghino, 1891

Type species
- Analcimorphus inversus Ameghino, 1891

Other species
- A. giganteus Ameghino, 1894

Extinct genus of ground sloth

Analcimorphus is an extinct genus of ground sloth of the group Megatheroidea that lived during the Miocene stage of the Neogene period in what is now Santa Cruz Province, Argentina.
