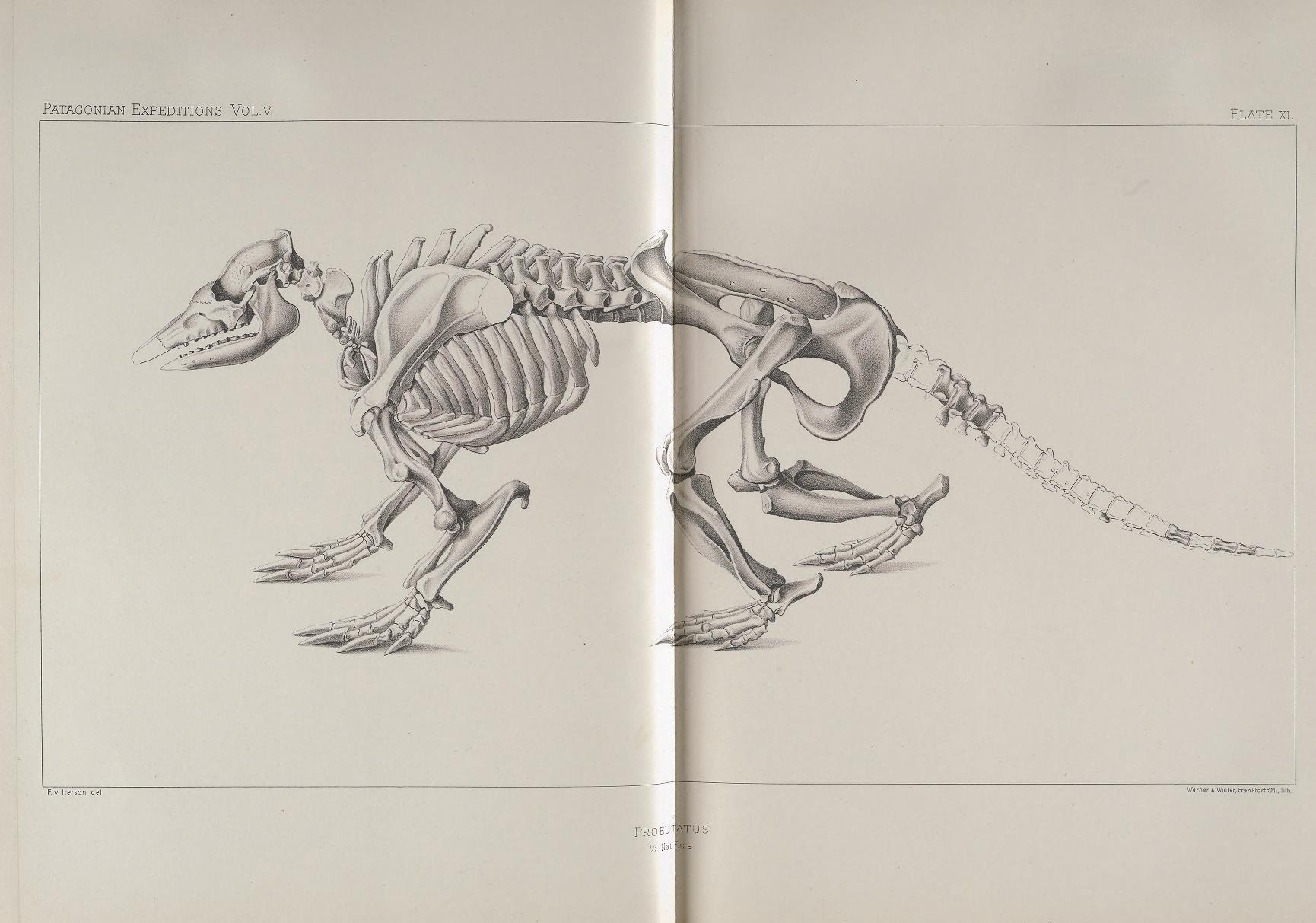
- Reconstructed skeleton of Proeutatus

Scientific classification
- Kingdom: Animalia
- Phylum: Chordata
- Class: Mammalia
- Order: Cingulata
- Family: Chlamyphoridae
- Genus: †Proeutatus; Ameghino, 1891

Type species
- †Proeutatus oenophorum Ameghino, 1887

Species
- P. oenophorum Ameghino 1887; P. postpuntum Ameghino 1902; P. robustus Scott 1903

Synonyms
- Eutatus bipunctatus Ameghino 1887

= Proeutatus =

Proeutatus Temporal range: Early Miocene ~20–15 Ma

Extinct genus of mammals

Proeutatus is an extinct genus of xenarthran, belonging to the order Cingulata. It lived during the Early Miocene, and its fossilized remains were discovered in South America.

== Description ==
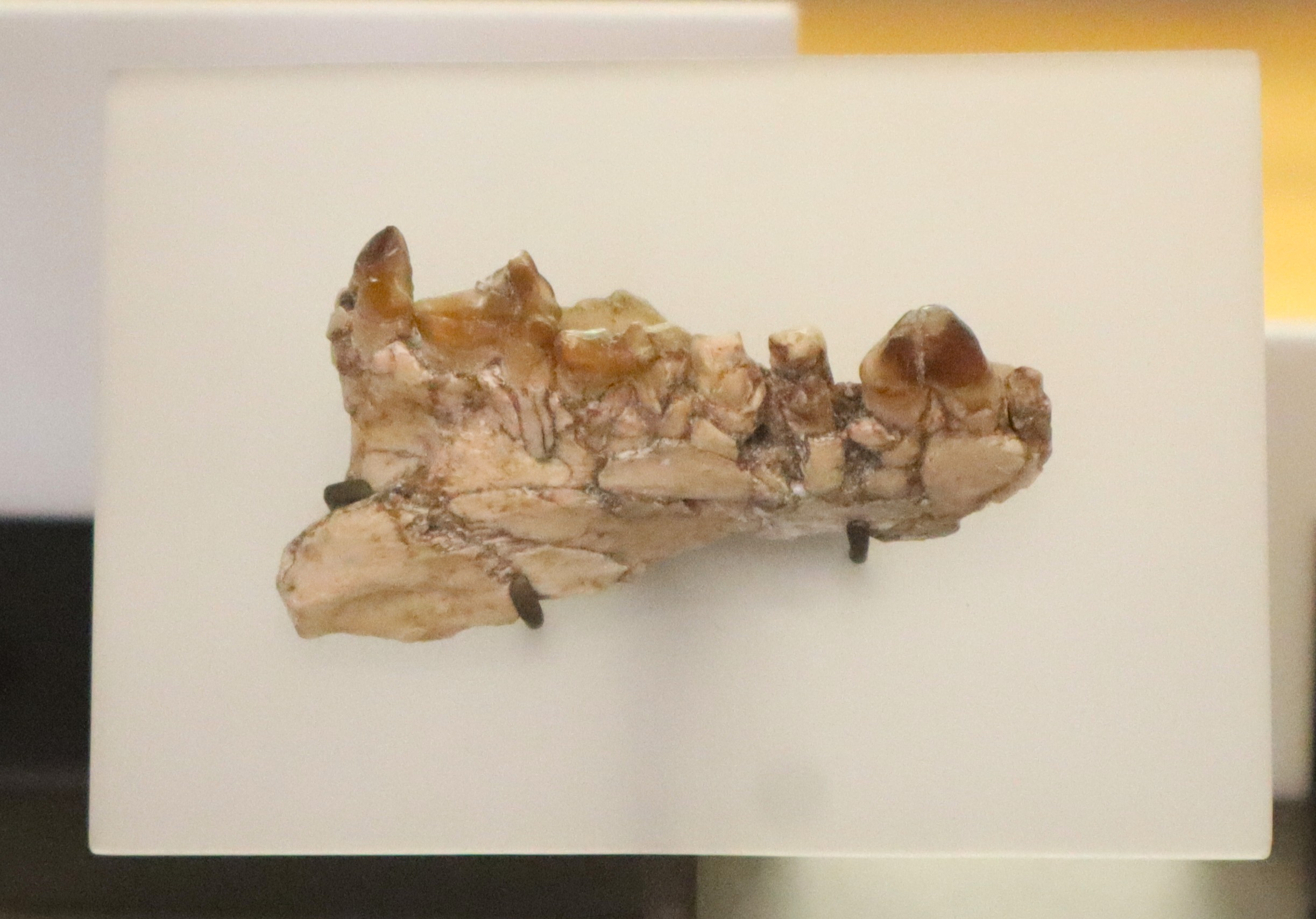
Jaw of Proeutatus sp., Beneski Museum of Natural History

This animal was vaguely similar to the extant six-banded armadillo, and was similarly sized. The skull was approximately 12 centimeters long, the whole animal not exceeding more than half a meter in length for a weight between 5 and 6 kilograms. Proeutatus had a quite sturdy body, a high reared skull with an elongated snout and a sturdy set of teeth compared to those of many other armadillos.

The skull of Proeutatus had some characteristics distinguishing it from the more similar forms, such as Stenotatus and Eutatus; the premaxilla had an upper tooth, the zygomatic arch was expanded and had a suborbital process; the mandible was more robust, with an almost vertically ascending branch and a higher coronoid process. The general shape of the skull was, in lateral view, concave, while it was straight and downwards tending for Eutatus. A sagittal crest was present, suggesting the existence of powerful masticatory muscles. The dentition was very robust, and the teeth possessed a posterolabial lobe, indicating a particular chewing movement.

== Classification ==
The first remains of Proeutatus were found in Argentina and described in 1887 by Florentino Ameghino, who attributed them to the genus Eutatus. In 1891, Ameghino created the genus Proeutatus for those remains; the two known species are Proeutatus oenophorus, the type species, and P. postpuntum.

Proeutatus was historically considered to be a member of the group Eutatinae, composed of medium to large armadillos specialized in an herbivorous diet. More recent researches indicates that it was a basal member of the family Chlamyphoridae, close to the origin of the glyptodonts and the Pampatheres.

== Paleobiology ==
The structure of its jaws and teeth indicates that it had an omnivorous diet, with notable specializations for the consumption of vegetal matters. Proeutatus was among the armadillos the most specialized towards an herbivorous diet.

== Bibliography ==
- F. Ameghino. 1891. Nuevos restos de mamíferos fósiles descubiertos por Carlos Ameghino en el Eoceno inferior de la Patagonia austral. – Especies nuevas, adiciones y correcciones [New remains of fossil mammals discovered by Carlos Ameghino in the lower Eocene of southern Patagonia. – New species, additions, and corrections]. Revista Argentina de Historia Natural 1:289-328
- F. Ameghino. 1902. Première contribution à la connaissance de la fauna mammalogique des couches à Colpodon [First contribution to the knowledge of the mammalian fauna of the Colopdon Beds]. Boletin de la Academia Nacional de Ciencias de Córdoba 17:71-141
- Sergio F Vizcaino and Maria S. Bargo. 1998. The masticatory apparatus of the armadillo Eutatus (Mammalia, Cingulata) and some allied genera: paleobiology and evolution. Paleobiology, 24(3), pp. 371–383
- Gaudin TJ, Wible JR (2006) The phylogeny of living and extinct armadillos (Mammalia, Xenarthra, Cingulata): a craniodental analysis. In: Carrano MT, Gaudin TJ, Blob RW, Wible JR, editors. Amniote paleobiology: Perspectives on the evolution of mammals, birds and reptiles. Chicago: University of Chicago Press. 153–198
