= Scleromys =

Scleromys Temporal range: Miocene

Scientific classification
- Kingdom: Animalia
- Phylum: Chordata
- Class: Mammalia
- Order: Rodentia
- Family: Dinomyidae
- Genus: †Scleromys; Ameghino, 1887

Type species
- Scleromys angustus Ameghino, 1887

Other species
- Scleromys colombianus Fields, 1957 Scleromys osbornianus Ameghino, 1894 Scleromys quadrangulatus Kramarz, 2006 Scleromys schurmanni Stehlin, 1940

Extinct genus of dinomyid rodents

Scleromys is an extinct genus of dinomyid rodents that inhabited the continent of South America during the Miocene epoch.

== Description ==
The species Scleromys quadrangulatus is distinct from Scleromys osbornianus in that the former has less hypsodont cheek teeth than the latter and larger, more persistent flexids and flexi.
