= Argyrohyrax =

Argyrohyrax Temporal range: Late Oligocene ~28–24 Ma

Scientific classification
- Kingdom: Animalia
- Phylum: Chordata
- Class: Mammalia
- Order: †Notoungulata
- Family: †Interatheriidae
- Subfamily: †Interatheriinae
- Genus: †Argyrohyrax; Ameghino, 1897

Type species
- †Argyrohyrax proavus Ameghino, 1897

Synonyms
- Argyrohyrax acuticostatus Ameghino 1901; Argyrohyrax concentricus Ameghino 1901; Argyrohyrax nesodontoides Ameghino 1901; Argyrohyrax proavunculus Ameghino 1897; Notohyrax conicus Ameghino 1901; Plagiarthrus cliva Ameghino 1894

Extinct genus of notoungulates

Argyrohyrax is an extinct genus of interatheriid notoungulate that lived during the Late Oligocene, of what is now Argentina and Bolivia.

== Description ==
This animal may have vaguely resembled a medium-sized ground-dwelling rodent, such as a marmot. Its skull was approximately 15 centimeters long, and its entire body may have reached one meter in length, including the tail. Argyrohyrax is differentiated from its closest relatives like Archaeophylus and Cochilius by small differences in its dentition, notably the overlap of the first premolar base by parts of the canine and the second premolar. Its maxilla had a very prominent descending process, as in Cochilius. The two first lower molars had a quadrangular trigonid and a subcircular talonid. The first lower premolar was canine-like.

Compared to some of its later relatives, Interatherium and Protypotherium, Argyrohyrax had a moderately expanded zygomatic arch; its radius had a slightly concave distal articular surface, and the articulation between its ulna and its humerus was less concave and more vertical.

== Classification ==
Argyrohyrax proavus was first described in 1897 by Florentino Ameghino; he later described several other species, such as Argyrohyrax acuticostatus, A. concentricus, A. nesodontoides, A. proavunculus, currently considered identical to the type species. The genus Plagiarthrus is similarly considered synonymous with Argyrohyrax. The genus Argyrohyrax is known from several fossilized remains discovered in Argentina, notably from the Sarmiento Formation in the provinces of Santa Cruz and Chubut, from the Agua de la Piedra Formation in Mendoza Province and from the Fray Bentos Formation in the Corrientes Province.

Argyrohyrax belonged to the family Interatheriidae, a group of medium-sized notoungulates, with a superficially rodent-like appearance. Several characteristics of its skull and dentition suggests that Argyrohyrax was nested as a basal member of the group.
