= Neoreomys =

Neoreomys Temporal range: Burdigalian–Tortonian

Scientific classification
- Kingdom: Animalia
- Phylum: Chordata
- Class: Mammalia
- Order: Rodentia
- Superfamily: Cavioidea
- Genus: †Neoreomys; Ameghino, 1887

Type species
- Neoreomys australis Ameghino, 1887

Other species
- Neoreomys huilensis Fields, 1957 Neoreomys limatus Ameghino, 1891 Neoreomys pinturensis Kramarz, 2006

Extinct genus of caviomorph rodents

Neoreomys is an extinct genus of caviomorph rodent that lived in South America during the Miocene epoch.

== Taxonomy ==
Phylogenetic analysis has shown Neoreomys to be a monophyletic genus not closely related to Dasyproctidae, but instead representing a plesiomorphic member of Cavioidea.

== Description ==
The incisors of Neoreomys australis were characterised by an enamel microstructure consisting of an interprismatic matrix whose crystallites ran parallel or at a very low angle to enamel prisms and without totally surrounding each prism.

== Palaeobiology ==
=== Locomotion ===
Geometric morphometric analysis of the foot of Neoreomys points to it having had a generalised mode of ambulation, in contrast to other Late Oligocene and Early Miocene caviomorphs.

=== Diet ===
Dental microwear analysis has found that Neoreomys australis was a consumer of fruits and seeds.
