= Santiagorothia =

Santiagorothia Temporal range: Early Oligocene (Tinguirirican) ~33–31 Ma

Scientific classification
- Kingdom: Animalia
- Phylum: Chordata
- Class: Mammalia
- Order: †Notoungulata
- Family: †Interatheriidae
- Genus: †Santiagorothia; Hitz, Reguero, Wyss & Flynn, 2000
- Species: †S. chiliensis

Binomial name
- †Santiagorothia chiliensis Hitz, Reguero, Wyss & Flynn, 2000

Extinct genus of notoungulates

Santiagorothia is an extinct genus of interatheriid notoungulate. It lived during the Early Oligocene, and its fossils were discovered in Argentina and Chile.

== Description ==
This animal was about the size of a large paca. It could reach 65 centimeters in length including its tail, with a skull approximately 10–11 centimeters; it weighed between 5 and 7 kilograms. Like its relatives, it had an elongated body, with strong legs, and compared to some of its more basal relatives, such as Notopithecus, it had more elongated legs and high-crowned (hypsodont) teeth. The molars of Santiagorothia were similarly sized to those of Eocene Archaeohyracidae, such as Pseudhyrax. The first incisors of Santiagorothia were enlarged and positioned straight in the alveoli, somewhat similar to human dentition. The upper premolars had two vertical ridges (ectoloph) and deep grooves on both sides of the lower premolars and molars, separating the anterior (trigonid), from the posterior (talonid).

== Classification ==
Santiagorothia was first described in 2000, based on fossils found in Chile, near the Tinguiririca River, and in Argentina in deposits of the Sarmiento Formation, dating to the Early Oligocene. Santiagorothia is an interatheriid, a family of small to medium-sized notoungulates, with similarities to rodents. Santiagorothia was an archaic interatheriid, less specialized than the later Cochilius, Miocochilius, Protypotherium and Interatherium.

== Paleobiology ==
Santiagorothia was a terrestrial herbivore, which fed on low vegetation in open areas, and was probably quite fast and agile.

== Etymology ==
The genus is named for Santiago Roth, "in honor of his contributions to South American paleontology".
