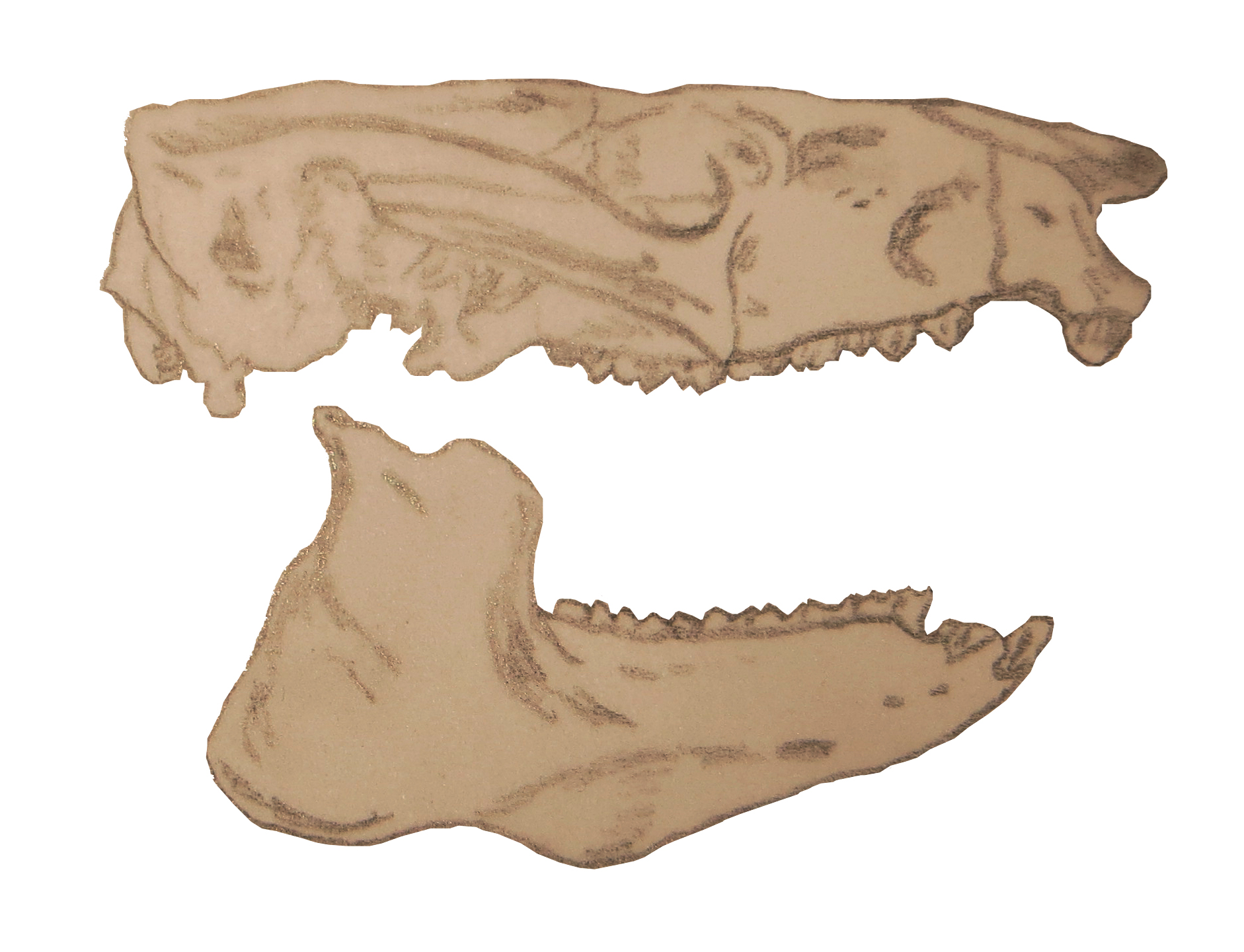
- Skull of Cochilius volvens

Scientific classification
- Kingdom: Animalia
- Phylum: Chordata
- Class: Mammalia
- Order: †Notoungulata
- Family: †Interatheriidae
- Subfamily: †Interatheriinae
- Genus: †Cochilius; Ameghino, 1902

Type species
- †Cochilius volvens Ameghino, 1902

Other species
- †C. brevirostris Bordas, 1939; †C. columnifer Ameghino, 1902; †C. fumensis Simpson, 1932; †C. minor Bordas, 1939; †C. pendens Ameghino, 1902

= Cochilius =

Cochilius Temporal range: Late Oligocene-Early Miocene (Deseadan-Santacrucian) ~29.0–16.3 Ma

Extinct genus of notoungulates

Cochilius is an extinct genus of interatheriid notoungulate that lived between the Late Oligocene and the lower Miocene in what is now Argentina.

== Description ==
The skull and skeleton show features also found in other similar contemporary or slightly later animals, such as Interatherium and Protypotherium. In the general proportions of the skull Cochilius was similar to Interatherium, but in some features it was closer to Protypotherium, for example, in the large development of the snout and the median position of the orbits. The epitympanic sinus was slightly spongy. The forelimbs resembled those of Interatherium, and were more puny than those of Protypotherium. The metacarpal bones were longer and thinner than those of Interatherium. The incisors were short and strong, while the molars were low-crowned (brachydont) teeth.

== Classification ==
The genus Cochilius was first described in 1902 by Florentino Ameghino, based on fossil remains found in Lower Miocene soils in Argentina. The type species is Cochilius volvens, but Ameghino described other species: C. columnifer and C. pendens, also from the Lower Miocene of Argentina. Later, George Gaylord Simpson described the species C. fumensis from Cerro del Humo in Chubut Province, Argentina from slightly older deposits dating to the Late Oligocene.

Cochilius belongs to the Typotheria, a group of notoungulate mammals that evolved during the Eocene in South America, going on to occupy various ecological niches that in the rest of the world were mainly occupied by rodents. Cochilius was a rather derived member of the family Interatheriidae, within the subfamily Interatheriinae.
