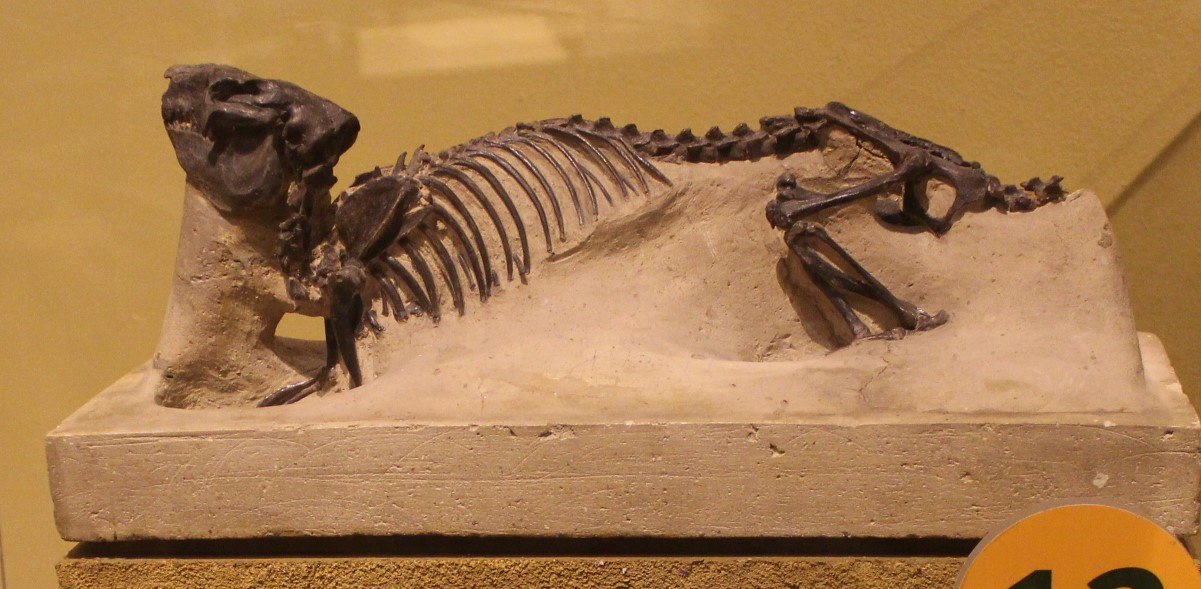
- Skeleton of Interatherium rodens in the Field Museum of Natural History, Chicago

Scientific classification
- Kingdom: Animalia
- Phylum: Chordata
- Class: Mammalia
- Order: †Notoungulata
- Family: †Interatheriidae
- Subfamily: †Interatheriinae
- Genus: †Interatherium; Ameghino 1887

Species
- I. anguliferum Ameghino 1894; I. brevifrons Ameghino 1894; I. dentatum Ameghino 1894; I. interruptum Ameghino 1894; I. robustum Ameghino 1887; I. rodens (Moreno 1882); I. supernum Ameghino 1894

Synonyms
- Tembotherium Moreno 1882

= Interatherium =

Interatherium Temporal range: Early-Mid Miocene (Colhuehuapian-Mayoan) ~21.0–11.608 Ma

Extinct genus of notoungulates

Interatherium is an extinct genus of interatheriid notoungulate that lived from the Early to Middle Miocene (Colhuehuapian-Mayoan). Fossils of this genus have been found in the Santa Cruz, Collón Curá and Sarmiento Formations in Argentina.

== Description ==
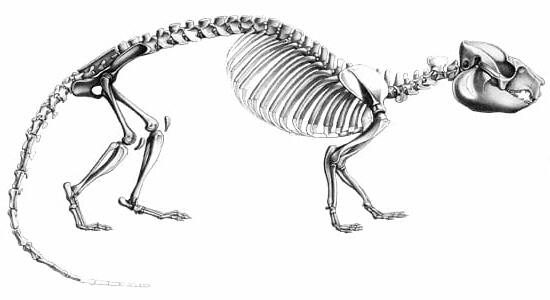
Skeletal reconstruction

This animal, of the size similar to that of today's American Mink (it was about 40 centimeters long excluding the tail), was equipped with a rather unusual morphology if related to that of its closest relatives. Contrary to shapes like Protypotherium, Interatherium possessed short and robust legs, and a long body similar to that of a weasel. The front legs were equipped with four fingers. The ointment phalanges were compressed laterally, and some of these were divided.

The Interatherium skull was equally aberrant: it was in fact much more compact than that of other archaic types, and the muzzle was as if it had been crushed. The jaw, in particular, was very deep and tall, protruded backwards and owned considerable notches for the insertion of powerful masses (one of the main muscles capable of chewing in mammals). The Masseter muscle was anchored to a large bony flange placed in the lower part of the jaw, known as the descending process. This process is greatly reduced in related interatheres: Interatherium's well developed process was superficially similar to the ones seen in glyptodonts, a taxon of giant armadillos. Like the other interactors, Interatherium possessed a complete teeth, including 44 teeth, but differ in having a diastema between the incisors and premolars. The space was accentuated by the dimensions of the last incisive and the canine, so small as to be absent in some specimens.

== Classification ==
Interatherium was described for the first time in 1887 by Florentino Ameghino, on the basis of fossil remains found in the province of Santa Cruz, Argentina, in strata dating to the lower Miocene. The type species is Interatherium rodens, which was named on the basis of a right maxilla that was first collected by Francisco P. Moreno in 1876-77. Several other species were described by Ameghino in 1894 (I. anguliferum, I. brevifrons, I. dentatum, I. interruptum, I. rodens, I. supernum, I. excavatus), many of which were then considered synonyms of I. rodens, though many of their holotypes have been lost.

Interatherium is the eponymous genus of the Interatheriidae family, a family that includes numerous medium-sized species from the Miocene of South America; Interatherium was most closely related to another Interathere from Santa Cruz, Cochilius.

== Paleobiology ==
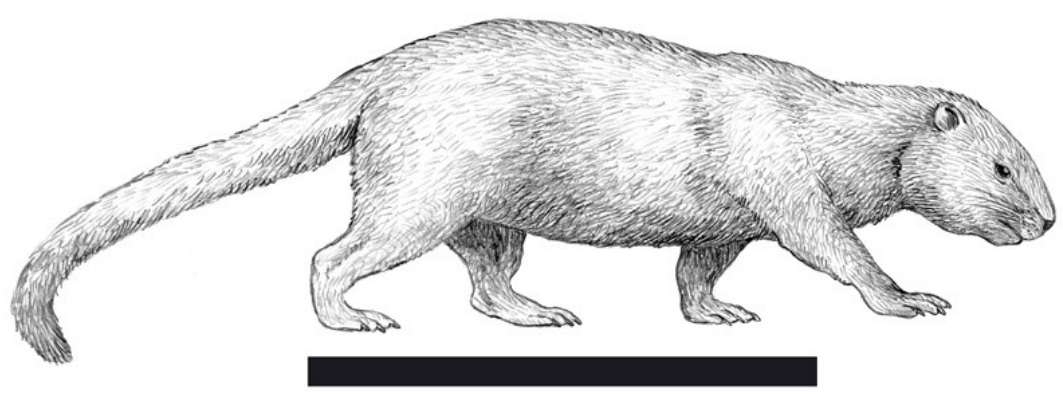
Life restoration of Interatherium. Scale bar = 25 cm

Due to the short legs and the elongated body, some paleontologists believe that Interatherium may have been an animal that lived in underground dens, but the legs do not show particular adaptations to digging. A principal component analysis of the ulna of Interatherium robustum found no evidence of the species having specialisations for digging or climbing.

Interatherum was certainly a herbivorous animal that fed on leaves, grass and vegetation that grew at the ground level, perhaps close to bodies of water. On the basis of its anatomical similarities to modern grazers, including a big paraoccipital process, a wide muzzle, a deep and very wide mandibular angle, and a relatively high hypsodonty index (3.33), Interatherium is considered to have been a grazer.
