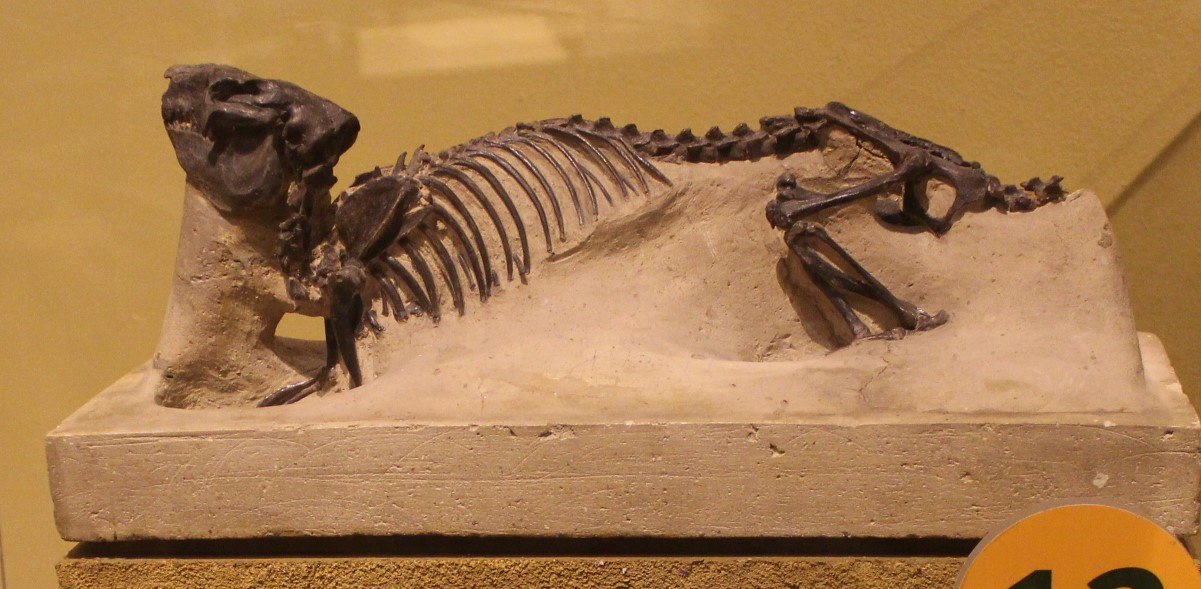
- Skeleton of Interatherium rodens in the Field Museum of Natural History, Chicago

Scientific classification
- Kingdom: Animalia
- Phylum: Chordata
- Class: Mammalia
- Order: †Notoungulata
- Suborder: †Typotheria
- Family: †Interatheriidae; Ameghino 1887

Subfamilies and genera
- †Antepithecus; †Antofagastia; †Guilielmoscottia; †Johnbell; †Munizia; †Punapithecus; †Transpithecus; †Interatheriinae

= Interatheriidae =

Interatheriidae Temporal range: Middle Eocene-Early Pleistocene (Mustersan-Uquian) ~48–1.8 Ma

Extinct family of mammals

Interatheriidae is an extinct family of notoungulate mammals from South America. Interatheriids are known from the Middle Eocene (Mustersan) to the Early Pleistocene (Uquian). These animals were principally small-sized, occupying a habitat like hares, marmots and viscachas. The majority were very small, like rodents.

Interatheriidae is one of the mammal groups that best represent the fauna from the Santa Cruz Formation. Particularly Protypotherium with three species is characteristic of the formation: P. australe, P. praerutilum and P. attenuatum. Another well-known genus is Interatherium, particularly well represented by I. robustum.
