= Collón Curá =

Collón Curá may refer to:

- Collón Curá River, a river in the Neuquén Province of northwestern Patagonia, Argentina
- Collón Curá Department, a department of the Neuquén Province
- Collón Curá Formation, a Miocene geologic formation of the Neuquén Province
- Colloncuran, a South American land mammal age named after the formation
