= Epipeltephilus =

Epipeltephilus Temporal range: Mid-Late Miocene (Burdigalian-Tortonian) ~15.97–9 Ma

Scientific classification
- Kingdom: Animalia
- Phylum: Chordata
- Class: Mammalia
- Order: Cingulata
- Family: †Peltephilidae
- Genus: †Epipeltephilus; Ameghino 1904

Type species
- †Epipeltephilus recurvus Ameghino 1904

Species
- E. caraguensis Montoya-Sanhueza et al 2016; E. kanti Gonzalez-Ruiz et al 2012; E. recurvus Ameghino 1904

Extinct genus of mammals

Epipeltephilus is an extinct genus of armadillo, belonging to the family Peltephilidae, the "horned armadillos", whose most famous relative was Peltephilus. Epipeltephilus is the last known member of its family, becoming extinct during the Chasicoan period. It was found in the Rio Mayo Formation and the Arroyo Chasicó Formation of Argentina, and in northern Chile.

== History and Etymology ==
Epipeltephilus was originally described in 1904 by Florentino Ameghino, its holotype being MACN A 11641, which included remains of the occipital and frontal areas of the skull, and fragments of the right mandible preserving five molariformes, coming from the Mayoan Rio Mayo Formation. In 1915, remains from the Arroyo Chasicó Formation are recovered, and they were first mentioned in literature in 1931. In 2012, Gonzalez-Ruiz, Scillato-Yané, Krmpotic and Carlini described the second species, E. kanti, with MLP 92-XI-19-7, three osteoderms, as holotype, with other osteoderms and a single molariform as among the remaining material associated to the species, all coming from the Arroyo Chasicó Formation. Finally, in 2016, a new species, E. caraguensis, is described from remains coming from Northern Chile by Montoya-Sanhuez, Moreno, Bobe, Carrano, García and Corgne, with, as holotype, SGO-PV 21102, composed of four osteoderms and fragmentary cranial and postcranial remains.

Epipeltephilus means, in Latin, "above Peltephilus".

== Description ==
Epipeltephilus's skull was larger than Peltephilus, and lower and wider in its posterior area, and its temporals were more extended laterally. The sagittal and occipital crests were less visible on Epipeltephilus, and its mandibles were larger, with vertically implanted, sub-elliptical molariforms, the last one being of similar size with the others, in opposition to several of its relatives. Like its relatives, it had the typical "horn" osteoderms.

== Species ==
=== Epipeltephilus recurvus ===
E. recurvus is the type species, described in 1904 by Ameghino. It is only known from remains coming from the Mayo Formation in Mayoan-aged rocks. While its holotype is only composed of the remains of a skull, several peltephilid osteoderms from the locality are commonly associated with the genus.

=== Epipeltephilus kanti ===
E. kanti is the last known member of the genus Epipeltephilus, and of the peltephilids as a whole. It is known from Chasicoan remains found in the Arroyo Chasicó Formation. The longitudinal crests of the quadrangular osteoderms were higher and more developed than in E. recurvus, and their exposed surface was rougher and more similar to those of Peltephilus and Peltecoelus. The teeth were subtriangular.

The species was named in honour of the Prussian philosopher Immanuel Kant.

=== Epipeltephilus caraguensis ===
E. caraguensis was found in Mayoan period rocks from the Chilean Precordillera. Its osteoderms were larger and very different from all other horned armadillos, with a tubular, rough and raised anterior edge.

The name "caraguensis" means "from Caragua", the locality near the town of Putre where the remains of the species were extracted.

== Palaeoecology ==
While originally recovered as carnivorous armadillos, peltephilids are now considered to be more generalist, able to dig to find tough tubers, but also eating potentially carrion. Finally, in 2016, a new species, E. caraguensis, is described from remains coming from Northern Chile by Montoya-Sanhuez, Moreno, Bobe, Carrano, García and Corgne, with, as holotype, SGO-PV 21102, composed of four osteoderms and fragmentary cranial and postcranial remains. They were probably burrowers. While on the edge of extinction during the late Miocene, they were still widely distributed, known from Patagonia to the Central Andes.
