= Collón Curá River =

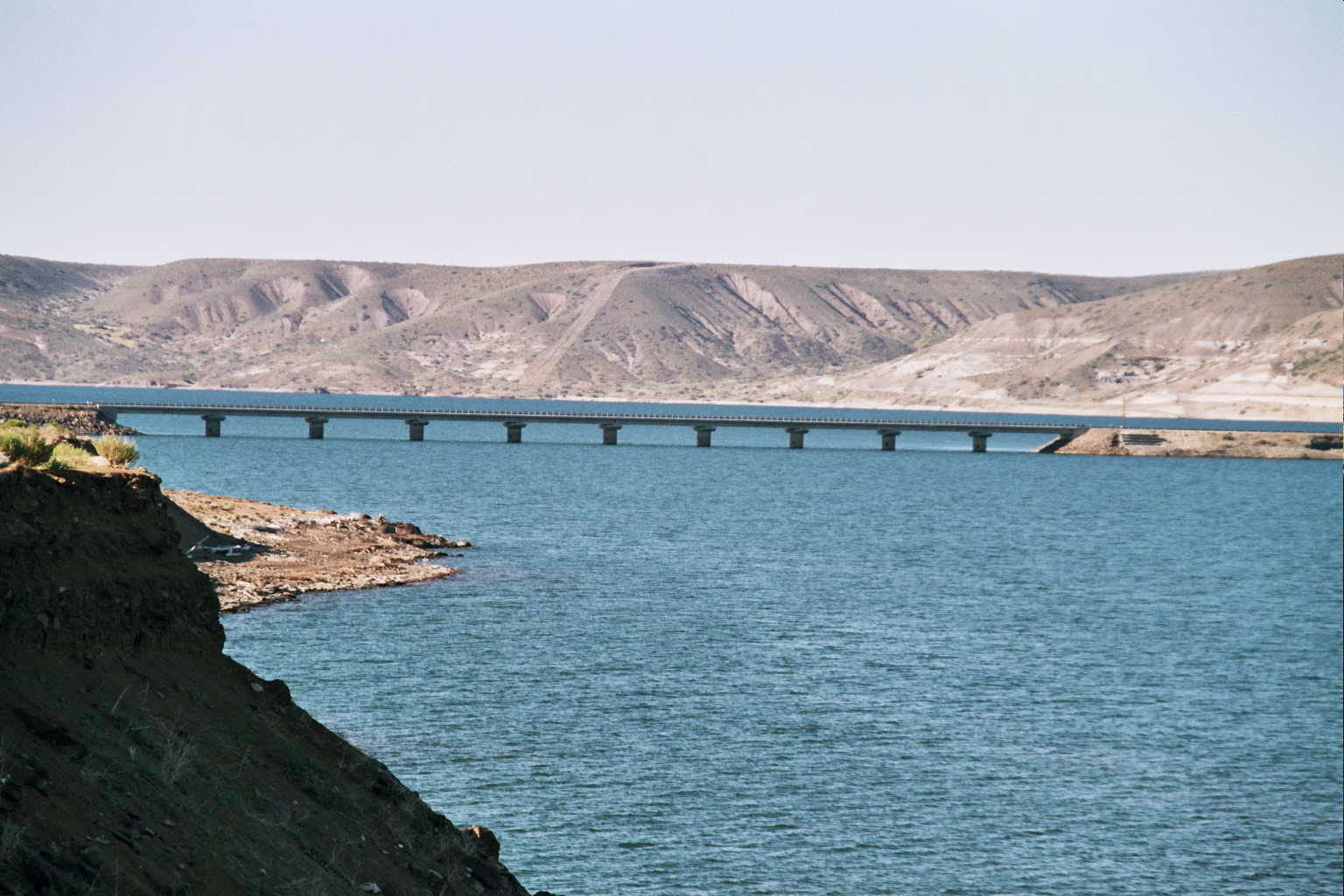
- Bridge over the Collón Curá River

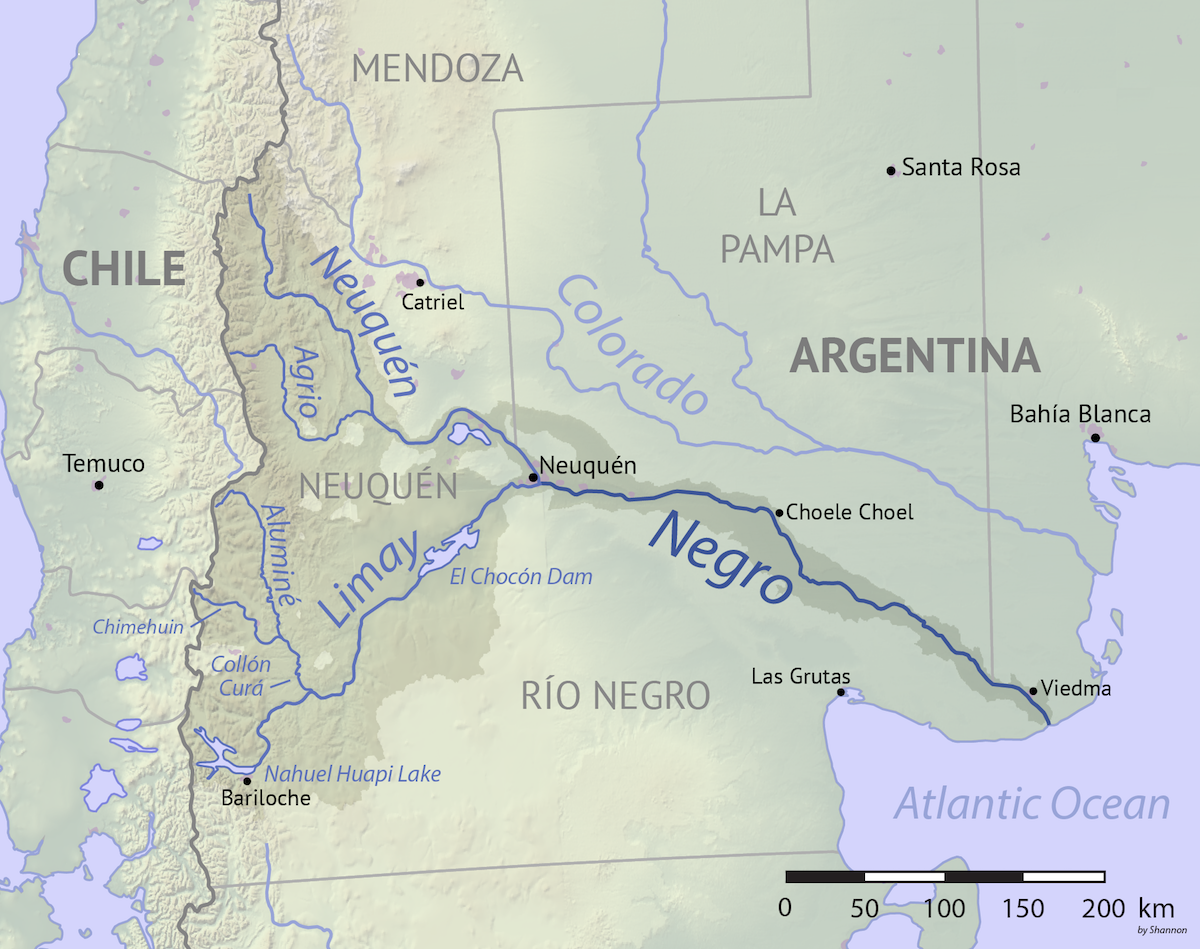
- Map of the Río Negro watershed with the Collón Curá River indicated
- Native name: Río Collón Curá (Spanish)

Location
- Country: Argentina
- Province: Neuquén

Physical characteristics
- Source
  - coordinates: 39°57′48″S 71°04′32″W
  - elevation: 970 m (3,180 ft)
- Mouth: Limay River
- Length: 70 km (43 mi)

Basin features
- River system: Río Negro

The Collón Curá River is a geographical feature of Neuquén Province, Argentina. It flows southward from the confluence of the Aluminé and Chimehuin Rivers, near the town of Junín de los Andes, for around 70 kilometres (43 mi), past which it becomes a tributary of the Limay River. The Collón Curá Formation and in turn the South American land mammal age Colloncuran are named after the river.

The valley is famous for its two activities: birdwatching and fly fishing.

== See also ==
- List of rivers of Argentina
