= Collón Curá Formation =

Geological formation in Argentina

- Stratigraphic range: Langhian-earliest Tortonian (typically Colloncuran); ~16.1–10.7 Ma
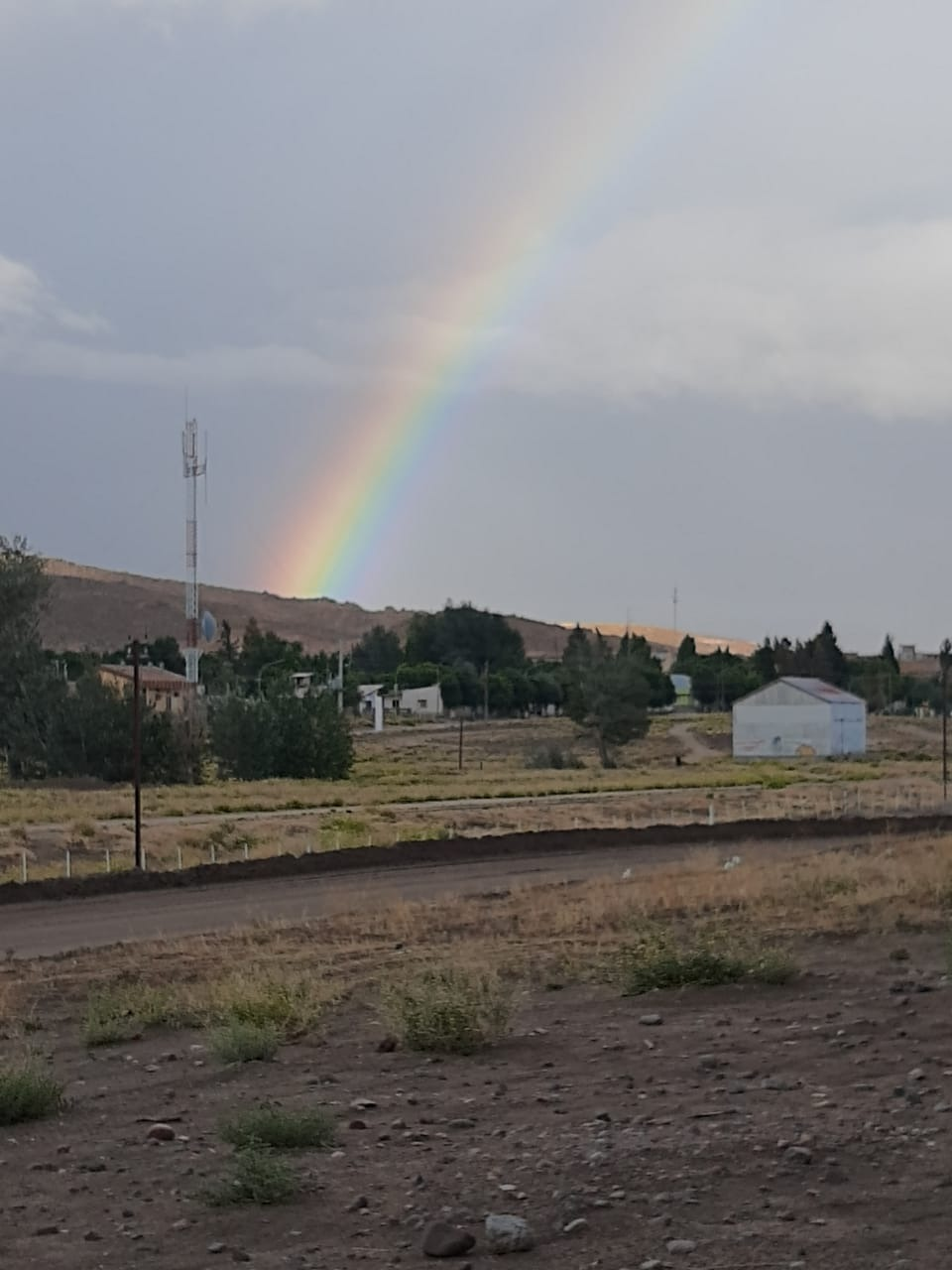
- Area around the Comallo railway, with outcrops of this formation
- Type: Geological formation
- Sub-units: Tobaceo Las Bayas & Pilcaniyeú Ignimbrite Members
- Underlies: Caleufú Formation & Chenqueniyeu Basalt (Neuquén Basin); El Mirador, Río Negro Formation & alluvium (Cañadón Asfalto Basin)
- Overlies: Cerro Bandera, Huitrera & Cerro Petiso Formations, crystalline basement (Neuquén Basin); Ñirihuau, Lefipán & La Pava Formations (Cañadón Asfalto Basin)
- Thickness: Up to 300 m (980 ft)

Lithology
- Primary: Tuff, sandstone
- Other: Siltstone, marl, limestone, calcareous concretions, pumice

Location
- Coordinates: 40.0°S 70.8°W
- Approximate paleocoordinates: 40.6°S 66.4°W
- Region: Neuquén, Río Negro & Chubut Provinces
- Country: Argentina
- Extent: Cañadón Asfalto & Neuquén Basins

Type section
- Named for: Collón Curá River & Estancia Collón Curá
- Named by: Yrigoyen
- Location: Lácar Department
- Year defined: 1969
- Coordinates: 40°04′56.6″S 70°51′55.3″W
- Region: Neuquén Province
- Country: Argentina
- Thickness at type section: 50 m (160 ft)
- Collón Curá Formation (Argentina)

The Collón Curá Formation (Spanish: Formación Collón Curá) is a Middle Miocene fossiliferous geological formation of the southern Neuquén Basin in northwestern Patagonia and the western Cañadón Asfalto Basin of central Patagonia, Argentina. The formation crops out from the southern Neuquén Province, the western Río Negro Province to the northern Chubut Province.

The formation, with a maximum thickness of 300 metres (980 ft), comprises tuffs and sandstones with minor siltstones, marls and limestones, deposited in a fluvial, deltaic and shallow to deep lacustrine environment in small basins separated by faults. The formation dates from the Langhian to earliest Tortonian epochs of the Middle to Late Miocene, typically Colloncuran.

The Collón Curá Formation is named after Estancia Collón Curá (1 on the map in the infobox) along the Collón Curá River (2), a tributary of the Limay River in the Río Negro watershed, and lends its name to the Colloncuran, one of the South American land mammal ages. The formation has provided many fossils of mammals, reptiles, among others the snake Waincophis australis, and the largest terror bird Kelenken guillermoi. The rodent Galileomys colloncurensis and the typothere Protypotherium colloncurensis were named after the formation.

== Description ==
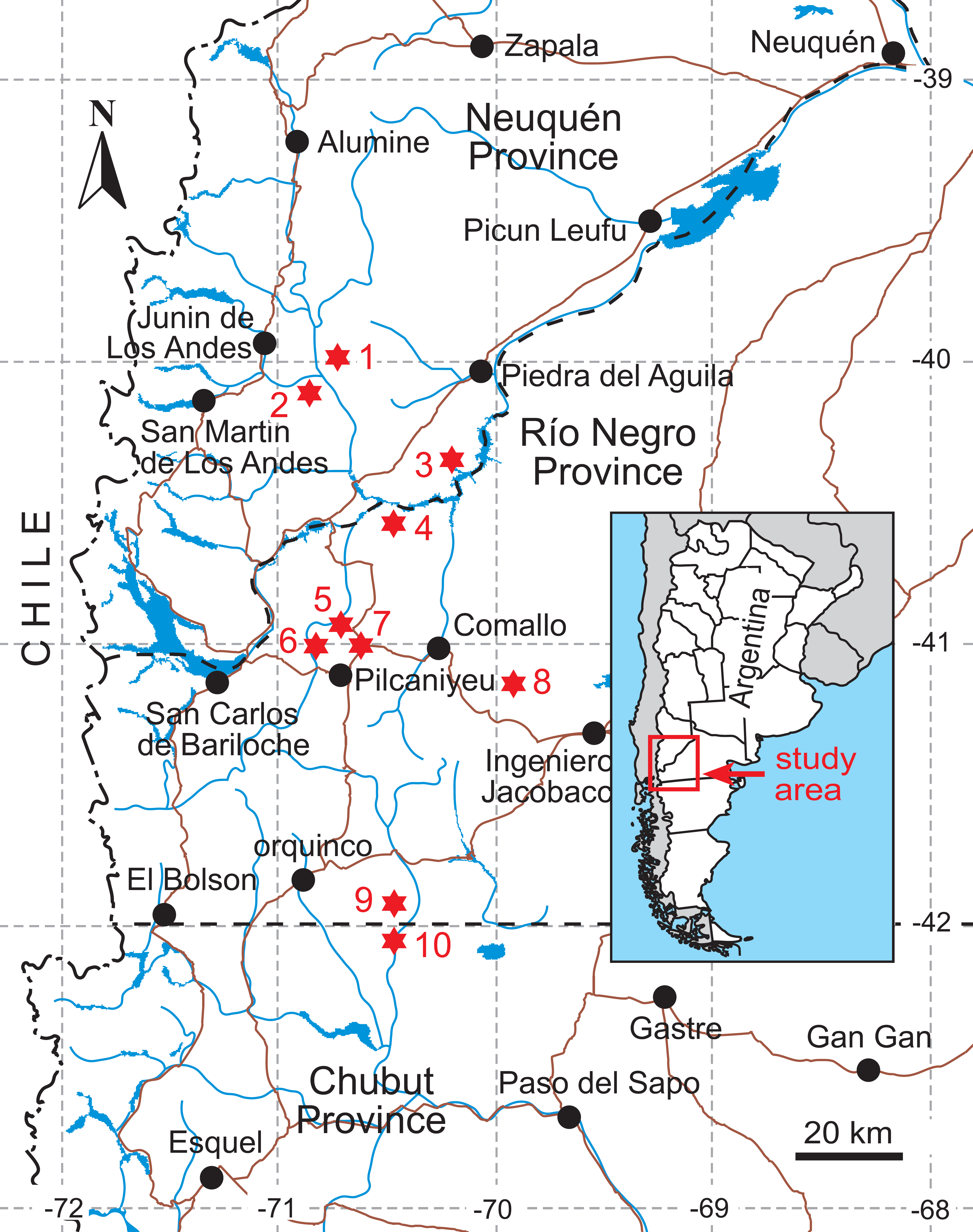
Outcrop locations of the Collón Curá Formation

The strata of the Collón Curá Formation were first recognized by Roth in 1899, based on a 50 metres (160 ft) thick succession of grey tuffs in the valley of the Collón Curá River. In 1929, Groeber named the unit Colloncurense, separating the sediments from the older Santa Cruz Formation, that Roth had grouped in the same unit. Yrigoyen in 1969 formally defined the stratigraphic unit as Collón Curá Formation. The type section of the formation is on both sides on the Collón Curá River. The maximum recorded thickness in the Collón Curá river valley is 130 metres (430 ft).

In the Chapelcó Range of the Neuquén Basin, the formation is unconformably overlain by the Caleufú Formation, while basaltic lava flows of the El Mirador Formation, and Quaternary alluvium overly the Collón Curá Formation in the Cañadón Asfalto Basin. In the Collón Curá valley, the formation covers Paleogene sediments of the Huitrera and Cerro Petiso Formations and in places overlying crystalline basement. In other parts of the Neuquén Basin, the formation overlies the Early Miocene Cerro Bandera Formation or the Late Cretaceous Angostura Colorada Formation. In the Cañadón Asfalto Basin, the Collón Curá Formation overlies the Ñirihuau Formation, and in the area around the Chico River in the same basin, the formation overlies the La Pava Formation. In this location, the Collón Curá Formation is unconformably overlain by the Río Negro Formation.

The oldest age for the formation has been given as 16.1 Ma, and the top of the formation has been dated to 11 ± 1, and more precisely to 10.7 Ma. ^{40}Ar/^{39}Ar analysis on amphibole crystals, collected from fresh pumice clasts, revealed an age of 14.86 ± 0.13 Ma for the middle section of the Collón Curá Formation in the Gastre Sub-basin of the Cañadón Asfalto Basin. Earlier estimates based on K/Ar dating on biotite minerals of the Pilcaniyeú Ignimbrite Member were given as 15 Ma (1980) and 14.1 Ma (1990). Overall, the age of the formation ranges from Langhian to earliest Tortonian.

=== Lithologies ===
In its type locality, the Collón Curá Formation is characterized by homogeneous greyish-yellow well-consolidated massive vitrocrystalline tuffs without visible sedimentary structures, but with calcareous concretions. The tuffaceous sediments contain pieces of white pumice with a vesicular character up to 2 millimetres (0.079 in) in size. The volcanic crystals in the tuff comprise andesine, hornblende and hypersthene in an argillaceous matrix. The concretions in the formation can reach up to 10 centimetres (3.9 in) in size and result from secondary diagenesis replacing the primary porosity of the sediments.

Around the Río Chico in the Cañadón Asfalto Basin, the formation is about 300 metres (980 ft) thick and comprises siltstones, sandstones, marls and limestones.

=== Depositional environment ===
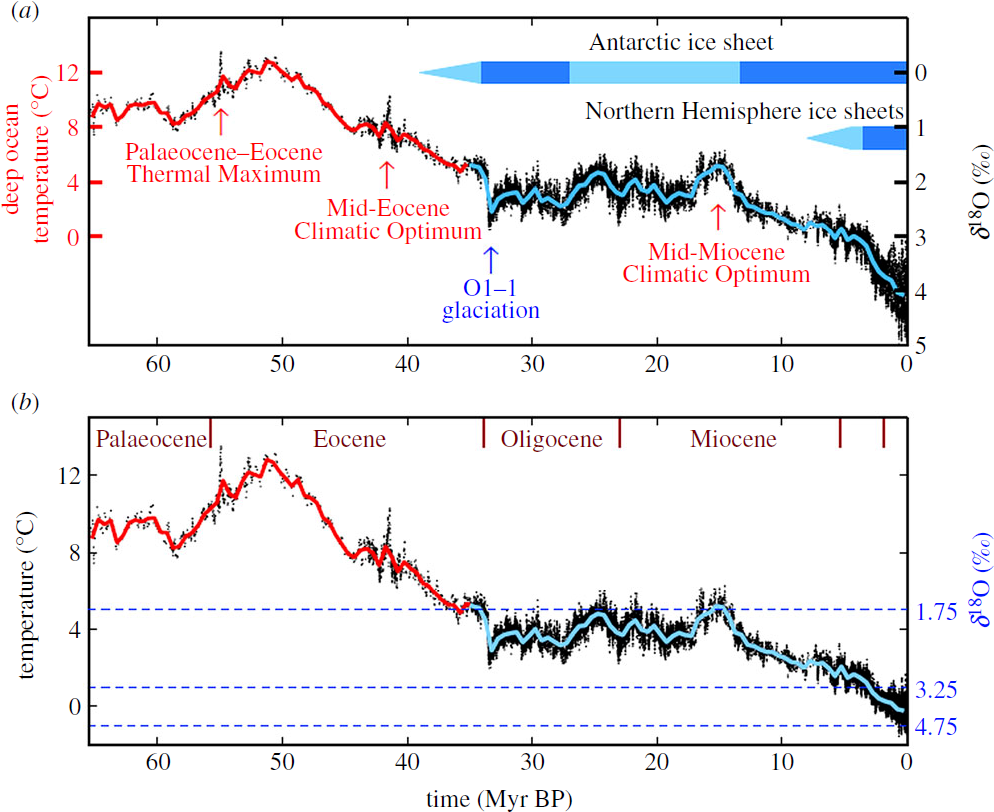
Significant drop in both temperatures after the Middle Miocene Climatic Optimum

The formation was deposited in a fluvial and lacustrine environment dominated by pyroclastic flows in small basins, separated by faults. The sub-Andean region of Argentina went through a phase of marine transgression during the Middle Miocene, approximately 15 to 13 Ma. The Collón Curá Formation shows growth strata in the Cañadón Asfalto Basin, indicating syn-tectonic deposition. In this basin, the formation ranges from a shallow lacustrine setting in the basal section, a deep lacustrine system with deltaic facies in the middle and upper parts. The Collón Curá Formation is correlated with the contemporaneous fluvial and lacustrine tuffaceous Chichinales Formation of the central Neuquén Basin.

The Collón Curá Formation, together with the underlying Ñirihuau Formation in the Cañadón Asfalto Basin, was deposited in a fragmented, possibly by pull-apart tectonic activity, foreland basin setting.

The climate in the early middle Miocene was hot, a period known as the Middle Miocene Climatic Optimum. This thermal maximum was followed by a period of cooling, the Middle Miocene disruption, probably related to glacial growth and the reestablishment of the ice of the East Antarctic Ice Sheet. Atmospheric concentrations of CO_{2} are estimated to have dropped from about 300 to 140 ppm.

== Paleontological significance ==
The mammal fauna of the Collón Curá Formation led researchers to establish the Colloncuran age in the SALMA classification, ranging from 15.5 to 13.8 Ma. This age, used in South America as subdivision for the Cenozoic, follows on the Friasian age, defined from the Chilean Río Frías Formation of the Aysén Basin and precedes the Laventan age, named after the Konzentrat-Lagerstätte La Venta pertaining to the Honda Group of the Upper Magdalena Valley of central Colombia.

The rodent Galileomys colloncurensis, and the typothere Protypotherium colloncurensis were named after the formation.

The fossil mammal assemblage of the Collón Curá Formation represents a fauna preceding the evolution of the Caviidae. The oldest true caviid, Prodolichotis pridiana is known from the Villavieja and La Victoria Formations of La Venta, Colombia. Sister taxa of these caviids first appeared in the Colloncuran; Guiomys unica and Microcardiodon williensis, found in the Collón Curá Formation. In alternative classification proposed in 2012 by Pérez and Pol, Guiomys is considered an optional early caviid, pushing back the lineage to the Colloncuran.

== Paleofauna ==
=== Birds ===
Name	Species	Location	Material	Notes	Images
Kelenken	K. guillermoi	Southwest corners of Comallo	A near-complete skull and partial skeleton.	A Phorusrhacid	
Yarquen	Y. dolgopolae		Phalanges and the distal end of the right humerus	An extinct owl.	

=== Mammals ===
==== Meridiungulata ====
===== Astrapotheria =====
Name	Species	Location	Materials	Notes	Images
Astrapotherium	A. guillei	Puesto Namur.	A skull	An astrapotheriid	

===== Litopterna =====
Name	Species	Location	Materials	Notes	Images
Theosodon	T. sp.	Estancia Criado		A litoptern.	

===== Notoungulata =====
Name	Species	Locations	Materials	Notes	Images
Caenophilus	C. zeballensis		A right mandibular fragment with right i1 (broken)–p4.	A notoungulate belonging to the family Interatheriidae.	

==== Metatherians ====
===== Sparassodonta =====
Name	Species	Location	Material	Notes	Images
Arctodictis	A. cf. sp.	Estancia Campionario	Fossil remains.	A sparassodont.	
Cladosictis	C. patagonica	Barrancas del Río Santa Cruz	A maxilla (left maxillary fragment with M3-4).	A sparassodont.	
Patagosmilus	P. goini	Rio Chico - RCH 018S.	A partial skull (most of the left side of the skull has upper dentition, right magnum, and proximal portion of the ungual phalanx.).	An early Thylacosmilidae sparassodont.	

===== Paucituberculata =====
Name	Species	Location	Materials	Notes	Images
Abderites	A. aisenense	El Castillo.	Left mandibular fragment with m1–m2, alveoli of m3 and anterior alveolus of m4.	A Paucituberculata marsupial	
Lemmythentes	L. kilmisteri				
Minusculothentes	M. zeballoensis				
Panchothentes	P. goini				
Zeballolagus	Z. ronniejamesdioi				
Zeballothentes	Z. incertus				

==== Primates ====
Name	Species	Location	Materials	Notes	Images
Cebidae	indet.				
Proteropithecia	P. neuquenensis				

==== Rodents ====
Name	Species	Location	Materials	Notes	Images
Acarechimys	A. sp.				
Alloiomys	A. sp.				
Dasyproctidae	Dasyproctidae indet.				
Echimyidae	Echimyidae indet.				
Eocardiidae	Eocardiidae indet.				
Erethizontidae	Erethizontidae indet.				
Galileomys	G. colloncurensis				
Guiomys	G. unica				
Maruchito	M. trilofodonte				
Megastus	M. sp.				
Microcardiodon	cf. M. williensis				
Neoreomys	N. sp.				
Neosteiromys	N. tordillense				
Prolagostomus	P. sp.				
Protacaremys	P. denisae				
Stichomys	S. sp.				

==== Typotheria ====
Name	Species	Location	Materials	Notes	Images
Hegetotherium	H. sp.				
Interatherium	I. sp.				
Pachyrukhos	P. sp.				
Protypotherium	P. colloncurensis			A Typotherian	
Protypotherium	P. endiadys			A Typotherian	

==== Xenarthrans ====
===== Cingulata =====
Name	Species	Location	Material	Notes	Images
Paraeucinepeltus	P. raposeirasi				Peltephilus Proeutatus
Peltephilidae	indet.				Peltephilus Proeutatus
Peltephilus	P. nanus				Peltephilus Proeutatus
Peltephilus	P. pumilus				Peltephilus Proeutatus
Proeutatus	P. sp.				Peltephilus Proeutatus
Prozaedyus	P. sp.				Peltephilus Proeutatus
Stenotatus	S. sp.				Peltephilus Proeutatus
Stegotheriini	Stegotheriini indet.				Peltephilus Proeutatus

===== Pilosa =====
Name	Species	Location	Materials	Notes	Images
Megathericulus	M. patagonicus				
?Neotamandua	N. australis				
'Xyophorus'	'X.' sp.				

=== Reptiles ===
Name	Species	Location	Materials	Notes	Images
Boinae	Boinae indet.				
Chelonoidis	C. gringorum				
Lacertilia	Lacertilia indet.				
Waincophis	W. australis				

== See also ==
- South American land mammal ages
- Cucaracha Formation of the Canal Zone, Panama
- Castilletes Formation of the Cocinetas Basin in northern Colombia
- Viche Formation of northern Ecuador
- Pebas Formation of the Amazon Basin
- Pisco Formation of the Pisco Basin in southern Peru
- Cura-Mallín Group of the western Neuquén Basin
