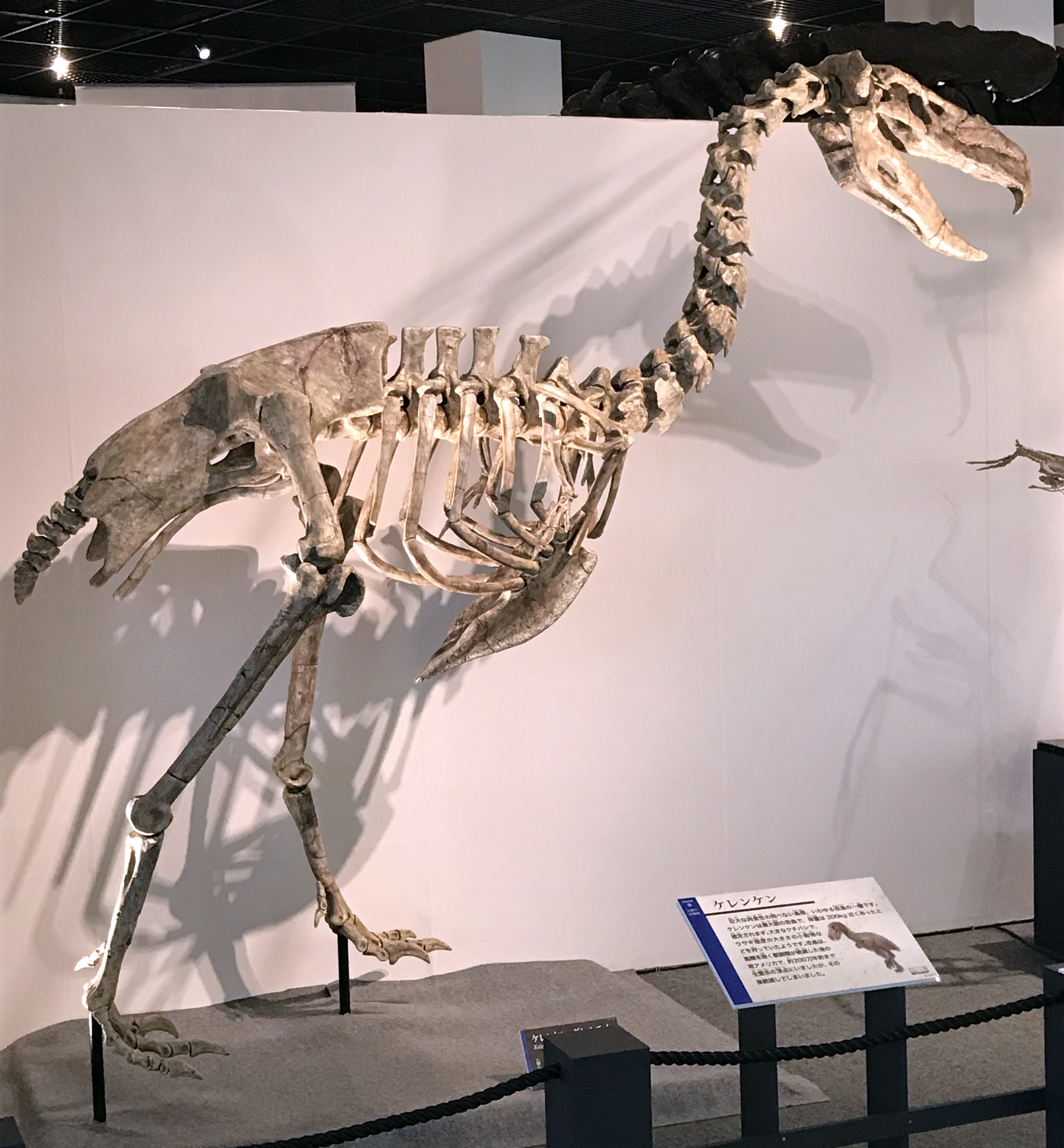
- Reconstructed skeleton in Fukui Prefectural Dinosaur Museum

Scientific classification
- Kingdom: Animalia
- Phylum: Chordata
- Class: Aves
- Order: Cariamiformes
- Family: †Phorusrhacidae
- Subfamily: †Phorusrhacinae
- Genus: †Kelenken; Bertelli et al. 2007
- Species: †K. guillermoi

Binomial name
- †Kelenken guillermoi Bertelli et al. 2007

= Kelenken =

Kelenken Temporal range: Middle Miocene (Colloncuran) ~15 Ma

Extinct genus of birds

Kelenken is a genus of phorusrhacid ("terror bird"), an extinct group of large, predatory birds, which lived in what is now Argentina in the middle Miocene about 15 million years ago. The only known specimen was discovered by high school student Guillermo Aguirre-Zabala in Comallo, in the region of Patagonia, and was made the holotype of the new genus and species Kelenken guillermoi in 2007. The genus name references a spirit in Tehuelche mythology, and the specific name honors the discoverer. The holotype consists of one of the most complete skulls known of a large phorusrhacid, as well as a tarsometatarsus lower leg bone and a phalanx toe bone. The discovery of Kelenken clarified the anatomy of large phorusrhacids, as these were previously much less well known. The closest living relatives of the phorusrhacids are the seriemas. Kelenken was found to belong in the subfamily Phorusrhacinae, along with for example Devincenzia.

Phorusrhacids were large, flightless birds with long hind limbs, narrow pelvises, proportionally small wings and huge skulls, with a tall, long, sideways compressed hooked beak. Kelenken is the largest-known phorusrhacid, 10% larger than its largest relatives known previously. At 716 mm (2.3 ft) long, the holotype skull is the largest known of any bird, and has been likened to the size of a horse's skull. The tarsometatarsus leg bone is 437 mm (17 in) long. Kelenken is thought to have been about 3 m (9.8 ft) tall and exceeded 100 kg (220 lb) in weight. Kelenken differed from other phorusrhacids in features such as the length of its beak, in having a supraorbital ossification (a rounded edge above the eye socket) that fits into a socket of the postorbital process, and in having an almost triangular foramen magnum (the large opening at the base of the skull through which the spinal cord enters).

Phorusrhacids are thought to have been ground predators or scavengers, and have often been considered apex predators that dominated Cenozoic South America in the absence of placental mammalian predators, though they did co-exist with some large, carnivorous borhyaenid mammals. The long and slender tarsometatarsus of Kelenken suggests that it could run faster than had previously been assumed for large phorusrhacids, and would have been able to chase down small animals. Studies of the related Andalgalornis show that large phorusrhacids had very rigid and stiff skulls; this indicates they may have swallowed small prey whole or targeted larger prey with repetitive strikes with the beak. Kelenken is known from the Collón Curá Formation, and lived during the Colloncuran age of South America, when open environments predominated, which allowed more cursorial (adapted for running) and large animals to occur. The formation has provided fossils of a wide range of mammals, with a few fossils of birds, reptiles, amphibians and fish.

== Taxonomy ==
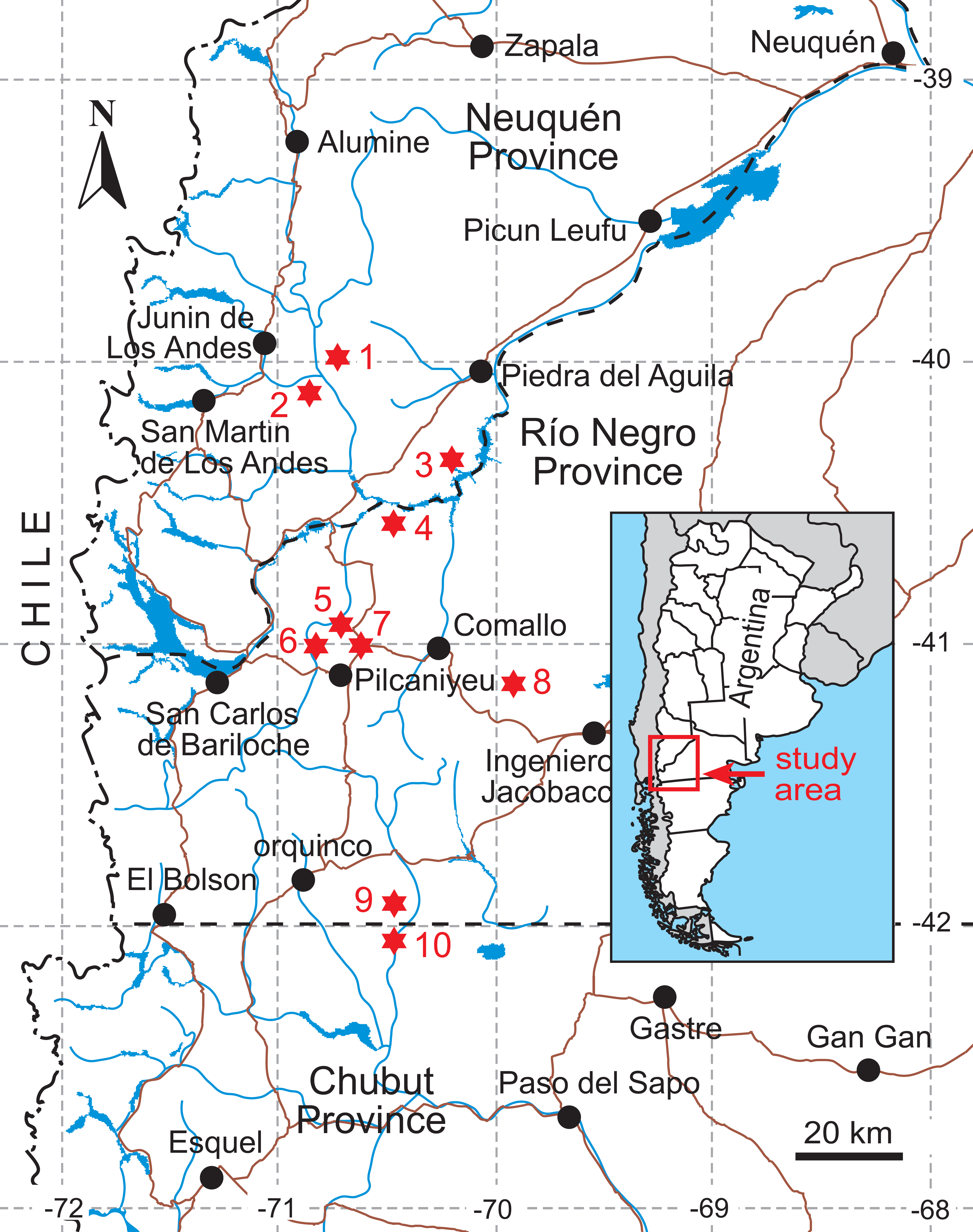
Map of Collón Curá Formation outcrops; the holotype was found in Comallo (8, middle)

Around 2004, fossils of a phorusrhacid (or "terror bird", a group of large, predatory birds) were discovered by Argentine high school student Guillermo Aguirre-Zabala between two houses, about 100 m (330 ft) from the railroad of Comallo, a small village in the north-west of the Río Negro Province in the Patagonia region of Argentina (coordinates: 41°01′59.4″S 70°15′29.7″W). The outcrops where the specimen was discovered belong to the Collón Curá Formation. Aguirre-Zabala prepared the specimen himself, and the discovery led him to shift from studying psychology to studying paleontology and Earth science.

The specimen became part of the collection of the Museo Asociación Paleontológica Bariloche in Río Negro, where it was cataloged as specimen BAR 3877-11. Prior to the animal receiving a scientific name, the specimen was reported and discussed by the Argentine paleontologists Luis M. Chiappe and Sara Bertelli in a short 2006 article. In 2007, Bertelli, Chiappe, and Claudia Tambussi made the specimen the holotype of Kelenken guillermoi; the genus name refers to a spirit in the mythology of the Tehuelche people of Patagonia which is represented as a giant bird of prey, and the specific name honors its discoverer.

The holotype and only known specimen consists of a nearly complete skull which is somewhat crushed from top to bottom, with most of the eye sockets, skull roof, braincase and left quadrate bone preserved, while most of the palatal bones behind the eye sockets are missing. The specimen also includes an associated left tarsometatarsus (lower leg bone of birds), a small upper portion of a foot phalanx bone (toe bone), and some indeterminate fragments. The describers concluded these bones belonged to a single specimen due to being collected together (and with no other fossils being present), because their general preservation (such as color and texture) was similar, and because they were morphologically consistent with belonging to a large phorusrhacid. The specimen possessed the most complete skull of a large phorusrhacid known at the time. Previously, such skulls were known only from the fragmentary Devincenzia and Phorusrhacos. The skull of the latter disintegrated during collection (leaving only the tip of the beak), which hampered comparison between phorusrhacid taxa of different sizes, until the discovery of Kelenken.

=== Evolution ===
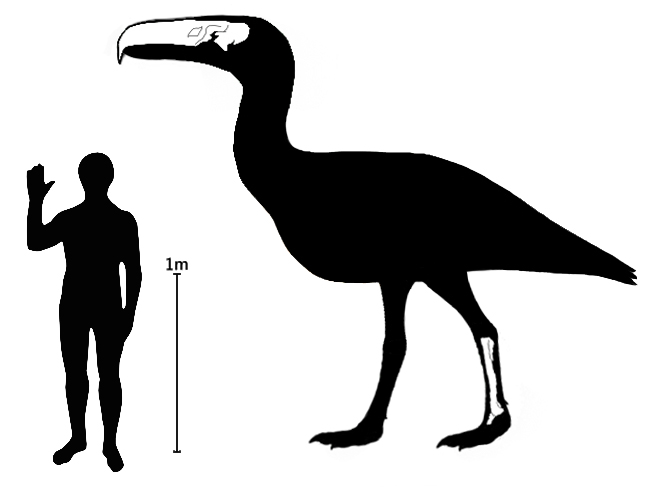
Diagram showing known remains

In their 2007 description, Bertelli and colleagues classified Kelenken as a member of the family Phorusrhacidae, based on its enormous size, combined with its sideways compressed, strongly hooked beak (or rostrum, the part of the jaws that formed the beak), and convex culmen (the top of the upper beak). Five phorusrhacid subfamilies were recognized at the time (Brontornithinae, Phorusrhacinae, Patagornithinae, Mesembriornithinae and Psilopterinae), though their validity had not then been confirmed through cladistic analysis, and the describers found Kelenken most similar to taxa that had traditionally been considered phorusrhacines. Features shared with phorusrhacines include that the hind part of the skull is low and compressed from top to bottom, a wide occipital table, a blunt postorbital process, and a tarsometatarsus that is similar to that of Titanis in that the supratrochlear surface of the lower end is flat. Further comparison was hampered by the lack of anatomical information about phorusrhacines.

The Brazilian paleontologist Herculano Alvarenga and colleagues published a phylogenetic analysis of Phorusrhacidae in 2011 that found Kelenken and Devincenzia to be sister taxa, each other's closest relatives. While the analysis supported there being five subfamilies, the resulting cladogram did not separate Brontornithinae, Phorusrhacinae and Patagornithinae. In their 2015 description of Llallawavis, the Argentinian paleontologist Federico J. Degrange and colleagues performed a phylogenetic analysis of Phorusrhacidae, wherein they found Phorusrhacinae to be polyphyletic (an unnatural grouping). The following cladogram shows the position of Kelenken following the 2015 analysis:

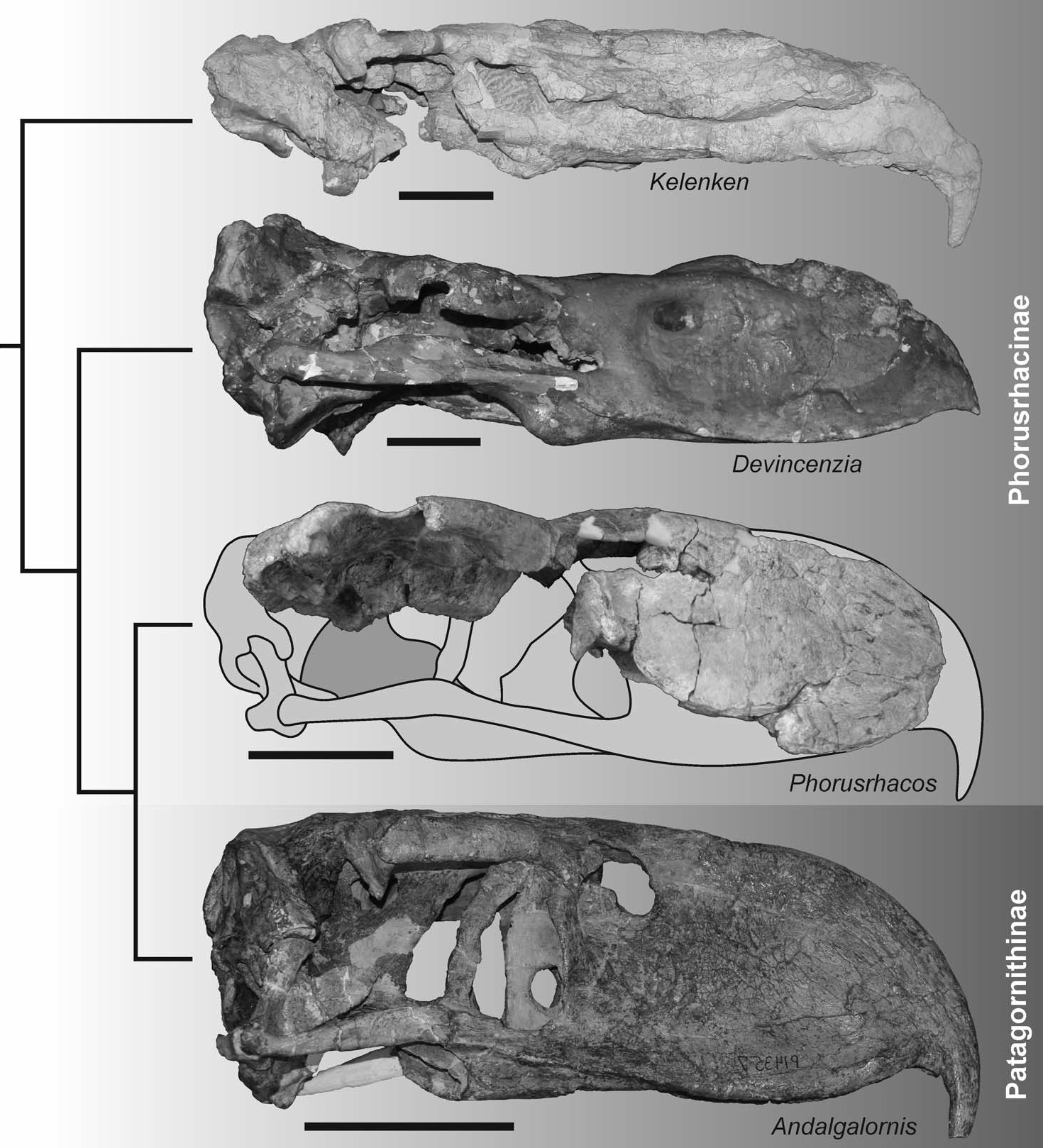
Comparison between skulls of large phorusrhacids

- Phorusrhacidae
  - - Mesembriornithinae
      - Mesembriornis incertus
      - - Mesembriornis milneedwardsi
        - - Llallawavis scagliai
          - Procariama simplex
    - Psilopterinae
      - - - Psilopterus affinis
          - Psilopterus bachmanni
        - - Psilopterus colzecus
          - Psilopterus lemoinei
  - - Kelenken guillermoi
    - - Devincenzia pozzi
      - - Titanis walleri
        - - - Phorusrhacos longissimus
            - Andalgalornis steulleti
            - Andrewsornis abbotti
            - Patagornis marshi
            - Physornis fortis
          - Paraphysornis brasiliensis

During the early Cenozoic, after the extinction of the non-bird dinosaurs, mammals underwent an evolutionary diversification, and some bird groups around the world developed a tendency towards gigantism; this included the Gastornithidae, the Dromornithidae, the Palaeognathae and the Phorusrhacidae. Phorusrhacids are an extinct group within Cariamiformes, the only living members of which are the two species of seriemas in the family Cariamidae. While they are the most speciose group within Cariamiformes, the interrelationships between phorusrhacids are unclear due to the incompleteness of their remains.

Phorusrhacids were present in South America from the Paleocene (when the continent was an isolated island) and survived until the Pleistocene. They also appeared in North America at the end of the Pliocene, during the Great American Biotic Interchange, and while fossils from Europe have been assigned to the group, their classification is disputed. It is unclear where the group originated; both cariamids and phorusrhacids may have arisen in South America, or arrived from elsewhere when southern continents were closer together or when sea levels were lower. Kelenken itself lived during the middle Miocene, about 15 million years ago. Since phorusrhacids survived until the Pleistocene, they appear to have been more successful than for example the South American metatherian thylacosmilid predators (which disappeared in the Pliocene), and it is possible that they competed ecologically with placental predators that entered from North America in the Pleistocene.

== Description ==
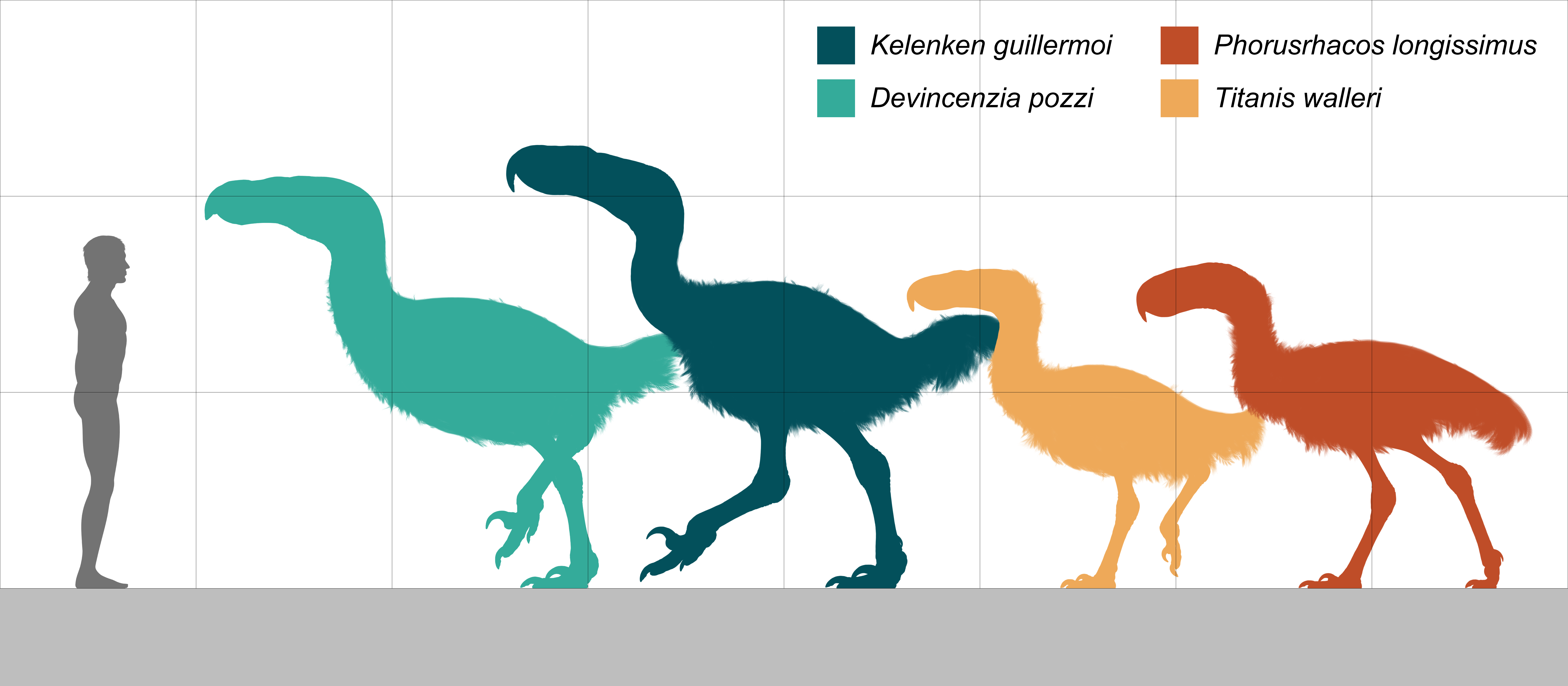
Size (dark green) compared to a human and other phorusrhacids

Phorusrhacids were large, flightless birds with long hind limbs, narrow pelvises, proportionally small wings and huge skulls, with a tall, long, sideways compressed hooked beak. Kelenken is the largest known phorusrhacid, about 10% larger than the largest phorusrhacids previously known, such as Phorusrhacos. The holotype skull is about 716 mm (2.3 ft) long from the tip of the beak to the center of the sagittal nuchal crest at the upper back of the head (a size likened to the size of a horse's skull), making it the largest skull of any known bird. The hind end of the skull is 312 mm (12 in) wide. The tarsometatarsus leg bone is 437 mm (17 in) long. The head height was up to 3 m (9.8 ft), while modern seriemas reach 90 cm (3.0 ft) in height. While the weight of Kelenken has not been specifically estimated, it is thought to have exceeded 100 kg (220 lb).

=== Skull ===
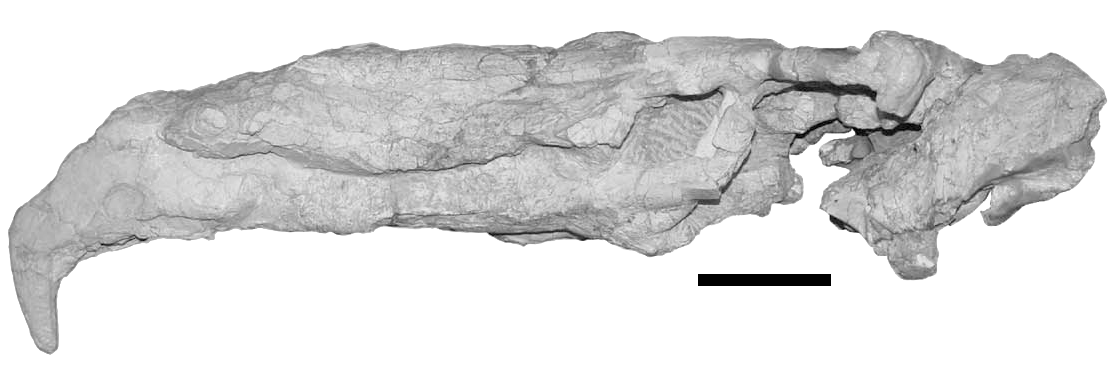
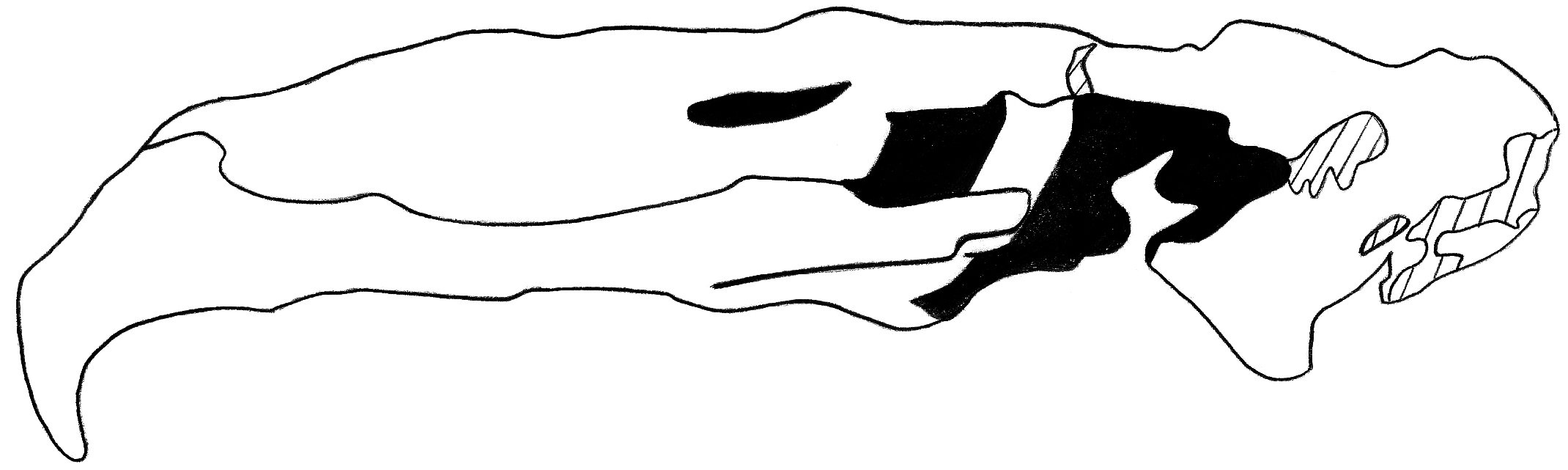
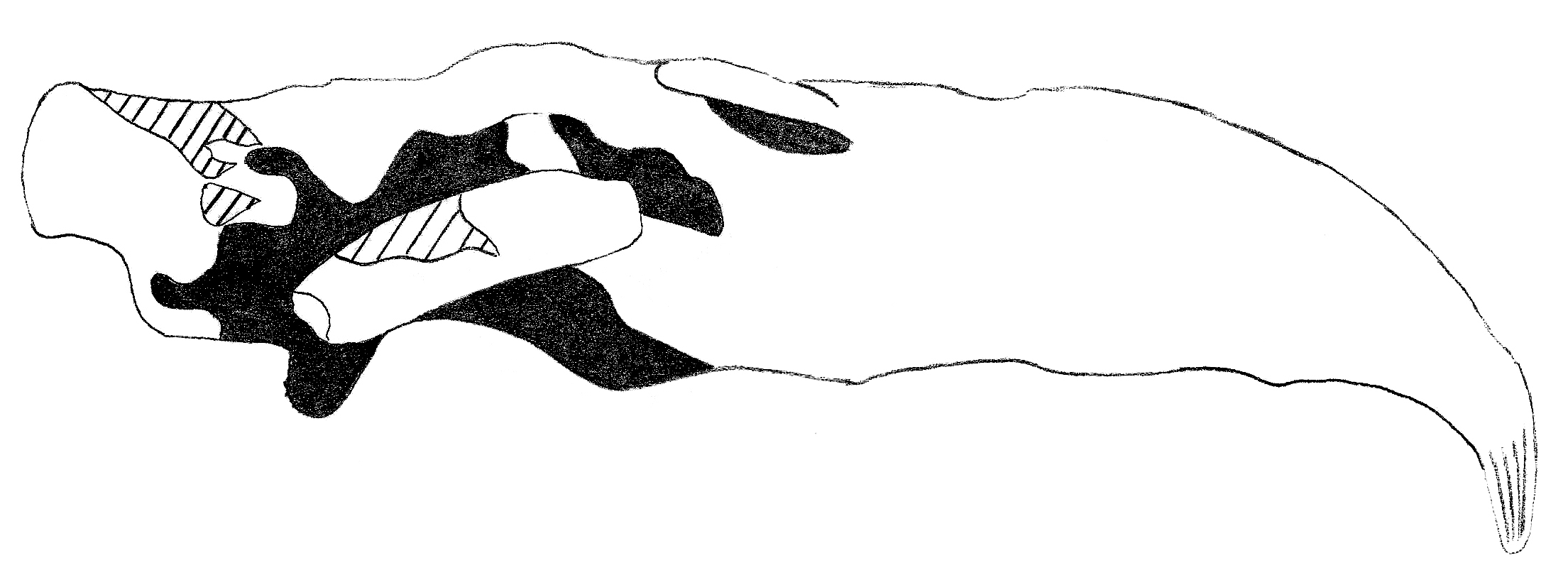
Holotype skull and diagrams

Prior to the discovery of Kelenken, the skulls of incompletely known large phorusrhacids were reconstructed as scaled up versions of those of smaller, more complete relatives like Psilopterus and Patagornis, as exemplified by a frequently reproduced 1895 sketch of the destroyed skull of the large Phorusrhacos, which was itself based on that of Patagornis. These reconstructions highlighted their assumed very tall beaks, round, high eye sockets, and vaulted braincases, but Kelenken demonstrated the significant difference between the skulls of large and small members of the group. The holotype skull is very massive, and triangular when viewed from above, with the hind portion compressed from top to bottom. The upper beak is very long, exceeding half the total length of the skull, unlike in Mesembriornis and Patagornis, and is longer than that of Phorusrhacos. The ratio between the upper beak and the skull of Kelenken is 0.56, based on the distance between the bony nostril and the front tip. In spite of the crushing from top to bottom, the upper beak is high and very robust, though apparently not as high as in patagornithines, such as Patagornis, Andrewsornis and Andalgalornis.

The front end of the premaxilla (the frontmost bone of the upper jaw) prominently projects as a sharp, downturned hook. Such a strong downwards projection resembles most closely the condition seen in large to medium-sized phorusrhacids such as Phorusrhacos, Patagornis, Andrewsornis and Andalgalornis, rather than the weaker projections of the smaller psilopterines. The underside of the upper beak's front portion forms a pair of prominent ridges that are each separated by a groove from the tomium, or sharp edge of the beak. These ridges are also separated from a broader central portion of the premaxilla by a longitudinal groove (the rostral premaxillar canal). Patagornis had a similar morphology on the front part of the palate. Much of the upper beak's side is scarred by small, irregular pits, which functioned as nerve exits. The hindmost two thirds of the upper beak are excavated by a prominent furrow, which runs parallel to the margin of the tomium.

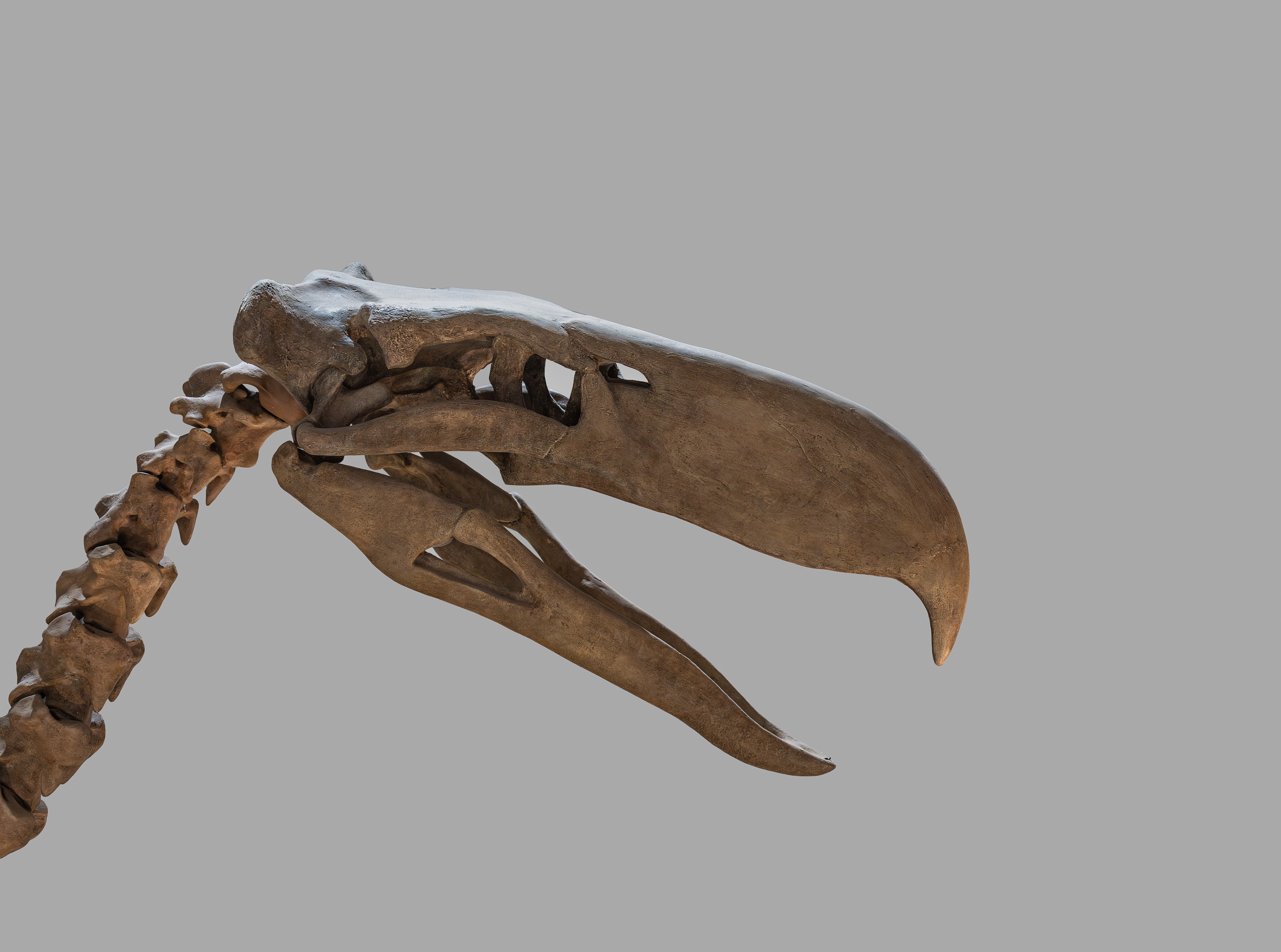
Reconstructed skull and neck, Museo Nacional de Historia Natural de Chile

The nostrils are small, rectangular, and are located in the upper hind corner of the upper beak as in patagornithines (the size and location of the nostrils is unknown in the larger phorusrhacines and brontornithines). The nostrils appear to be longer from front to back than high, though this may be exaggerated by crushing, and their hind margin is formed by the maxillary process of the nasal bone (a projection from the nasals towards the maxilla, the main bone of the upper jaw). Whether the nostrils are connected to each other at the middle (lacking a septum as in other phorusrhacids) is not discernible. The quadrangular shape of the antorbital fenestra (an opening in front of the eye socket) is clear despite it being crushed somewhat on both sides. The front border of this opening is approximately level with the hind margin of the nostril, and its lower margin is straight when viewed from the left side. Robust lacrimal bones form the hind margins of the antorbital fenestrae, and these bones were recessed in relation to the jugal bar (that formed the lower edge of the eye socket) and the outer side margin of each frontal bone (main bones of the forehead). The antorbital fenestra is proportionally smaller than that of Patagornis.

While the shape of the eye sockets may be slightly affected by compression from top to bottom, it is likely they were low, almost rectangular in shape, with a concave upper margin and a slightly convex lower border. The upper part of the eye socket is delineated by a thick, rounded edge (a supraorbital ossification), the hind part of which appears to overhang downward as seen from the side. In Patagornis, a similar structure has been suggested to be a process of the lacrimal bone, and while the connection between these is not clear in Kelenken, this structure was probably also an extension of the lacrimal. The supraorbital ossification fits within a socket formed by a part of the frontal bone that forms the postorbital process, a configuration unknown in other phorusrhacids. The lower margin of the eye socket is formed by a robust jugal bar which is very tall (larger than that of Devincenzia), and flat from side to side. The jugal bone is about four times taller than thick by the lower center of the eyesocket, and its height is greater than in other phorusrhacids.

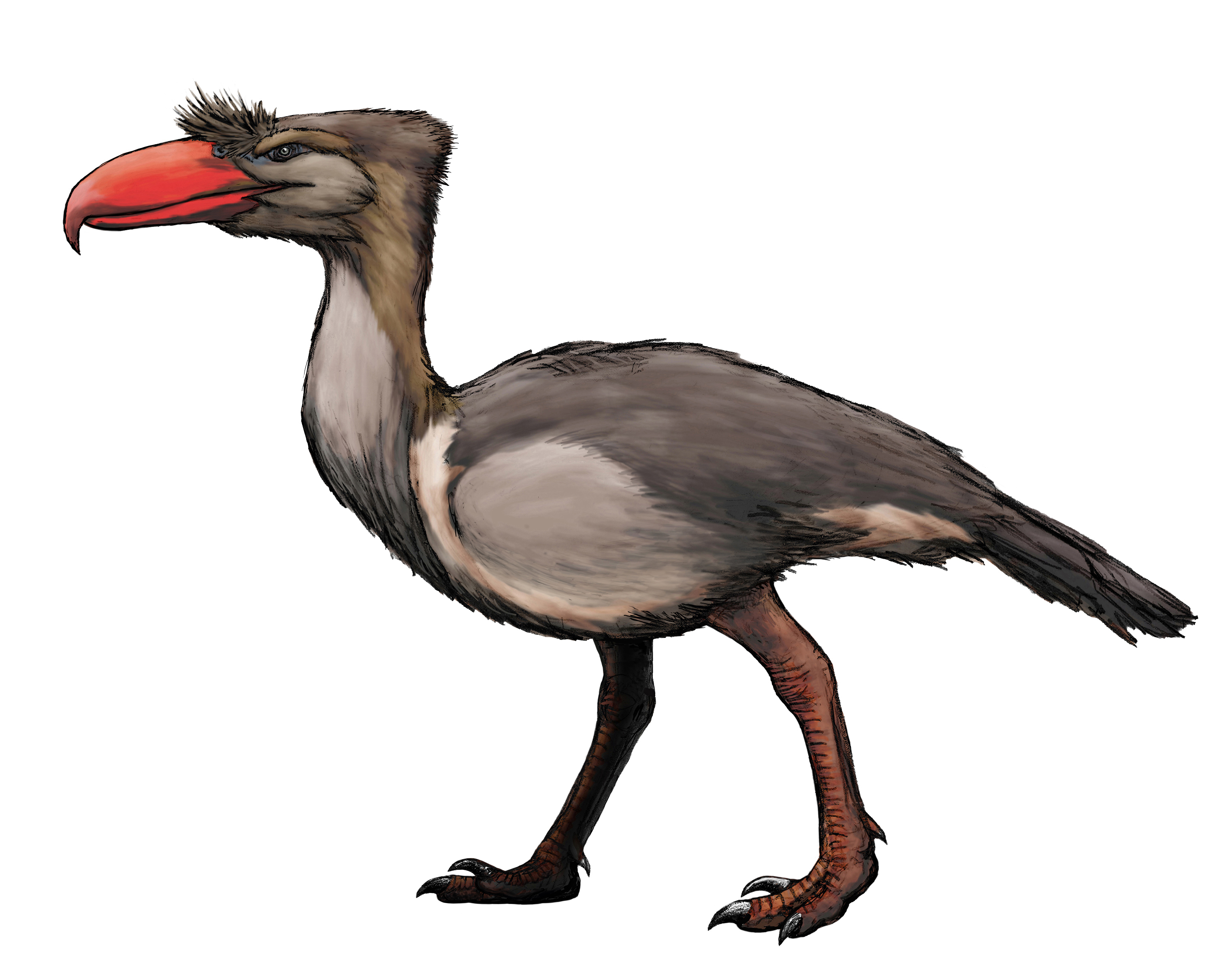
Life restoration

The frontal bones appear to have been flat on their upper side. The area where the frontals would have contacted the premaxillae is damaged so that their sutures (joints between them) cannot be identified, but the sutures between the frontals and the nasals and parietals are fully fused. This fusion makes it difficult to identify how these bones were part of the skull roof, but the blunt, robust postorbital processes were probably mainly formed by the frontals. On their lower sides, each frontal forms a large depression where a jaw muscle attached. The postorbital process is separated narrowly from a robust zygomatic process, and these two projections enclose a narrow temporal fossa (opening at the temple). The postorbital process contains scars left by massive jaw muscles, parts of which invaded most of the skull roof at the level of the parietal bones. There is a well developed depression behind the zygomatic process, along the side of the squamosal bone, which corresponds to a jaw closing muscle. The subtemporal fossa further behind is broad and its back is defined by a blunt, sidewards extension of the nuchal crest.

The maxillae form an extensive palate, with the side margins being almost parallel for most of the upper beak's length, and the palate becomes wider from the front back to the region of the eye sockets. Like in Patagornis, these bones are separated at the midline by a distinct, longitudinal depression running much of their length, and along the back half of the palate, this depression is flanked by portions of the maxillae. The side margin at the back of the maxilla has a sutured contact with the jugal which is well-defined, similar to Patagornis. The part of the skull roof behind the eye sockets is flat and scarred by the development of the temporal musculature. The occipital table is very wide, like in Devicenzia, and low, which gives it a rectangular appearance when viewed from behind. The occipital condyle (the rounded prominence at the back of the head which contacted with the first neck vertebra) is round with a vertical groove that originates on its upper surface, and reaches almost to the center of the condyle. The foramen magnum (the large opening at the base of the skull through which the spinal cord enters) is almost triangular, uniquely for this genus, and has a blunt upper apex, and it is slightly smaller than the condyle. Above the foramen magnum is a crest-like prominence, vertically extending from the edge of the foramen to the transverse nuchal crest. A fossa (shallow depression) under the condyle is not visible, differing from Patagornis and Devicenzia, whose fossae are distinct.

=== Leg bone ===
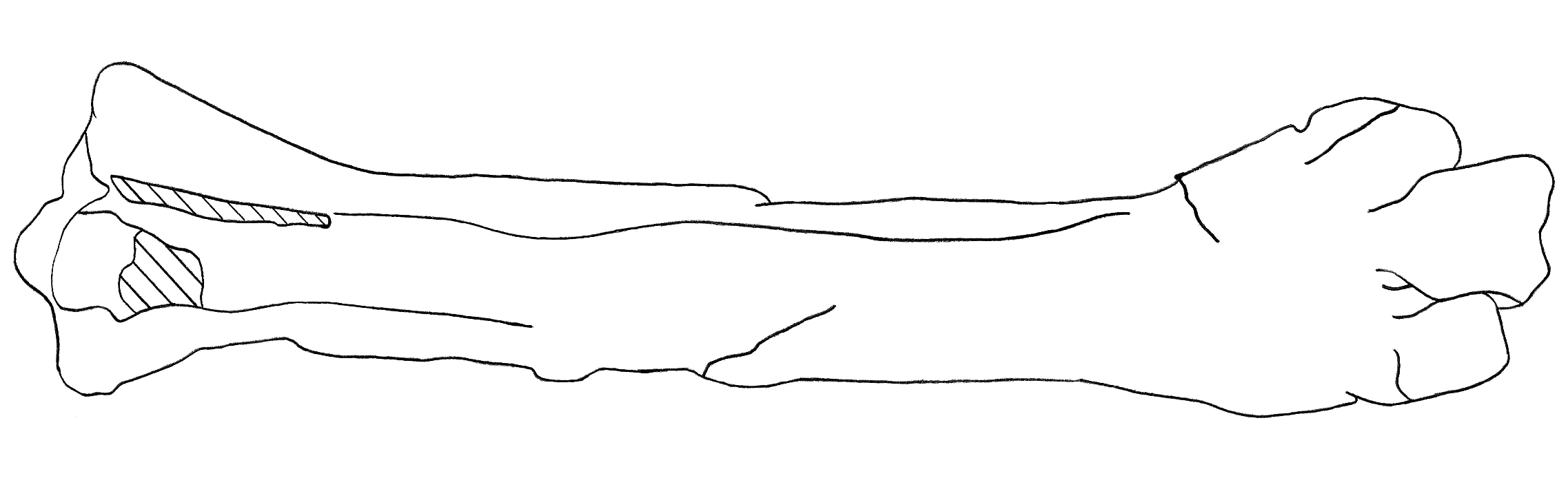
Sketch of the holotype left tarsometatarsus lower leg bone; the upper side is on the left.

The shaft of the tarsometatarsus is somewhat slender, with an almost rectangular mid-section, similar to Phorusrhacos. The upper two thirds of its upper surface are concave, while the lower third is flatter. The tarsometatarsus has cotylae (two cup-like cavities at the upper end of the shaft) that are almost oval and deeply concave. The lateral cotyla on the outer side is smaller than the medial cotyla on the inner side, and is slightly below it. The intercotylar eminence between the cotylae is well developed and robust, as in other phorusrhacids. Unique to this genus, there is a round tubercle on the medioplantar corner of the lateral cotyla, lower in height than the intercotylar eminence. The middle of the shaft of the tarsometatarsus is irregularly quadrangular, which is different from that of brontornithines, which are rectangular and very wide. The trochlea of the third metatarsal (the "knuckles" of the tarsometatarsus which articulated with the upper part of the toe phalanges) is much bigger than the two other trochlea (second and fourth), and projects much further down, and the fourth trochlea is larger than the second. The fourth trochlea is irregularly quadrangular, which contrasts with the rectangular trochlea of Devicenzia. The distal vascular foramen, an opening on the lower front side of the tarsometatarsus, has a centralized position, above the upper ends of the third and fourth trochleae.

== Paleobiology ==
=== Feeding and diet ===
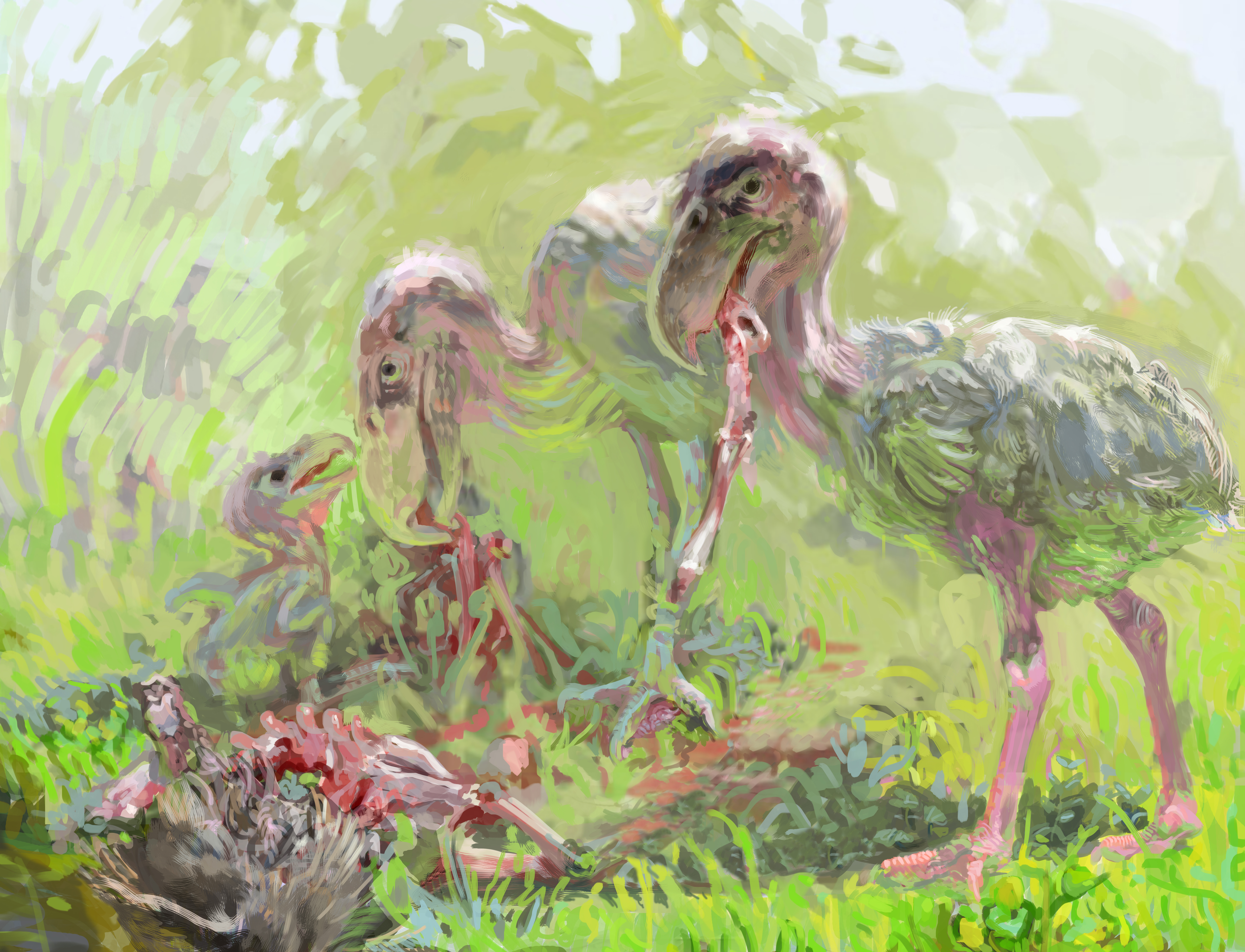
Restoration of a feeding group

Phorusrhacids are thought to have been ground predators or scavengers, and have often been considered apex predators that dominated Cenozoic South America in the absence of placental mammalian predators, though they did co-exist with some large, carnivorous borhyaenid mammals. Earlier hypotheses of phorusrhacid feeding ecology were mainly inferred from them having large skulls with hooked beaks rather than through detailed hypotheses and biomechanical studies, and such studies of their running and predatory adaptations were only conducted from the beginning of the 21st century.

Alvarenga and Elizabeth Höfling made some general remarks about phorusrhacid habits in a 2003 article. They were flightless, as evidenced by the proportional size of their wings and body mass, and wing-size was more reduced in larger members of the group. These researchers pointed out that the narrowing of the pelvis, upper maxilla and thorax could have been adaptations to enable the birds to search for and take smaller animals in tall plant growth or broken terrain. The large expansions above the eyes formed by the lacrimal bones (similar to what is seen in modern hawks) would have protected the eyes against the sun, and enabled keen eyesight, which indicates they hunted by sight in open, sunlit areas, and not shaded forests.

==== Leg function ====
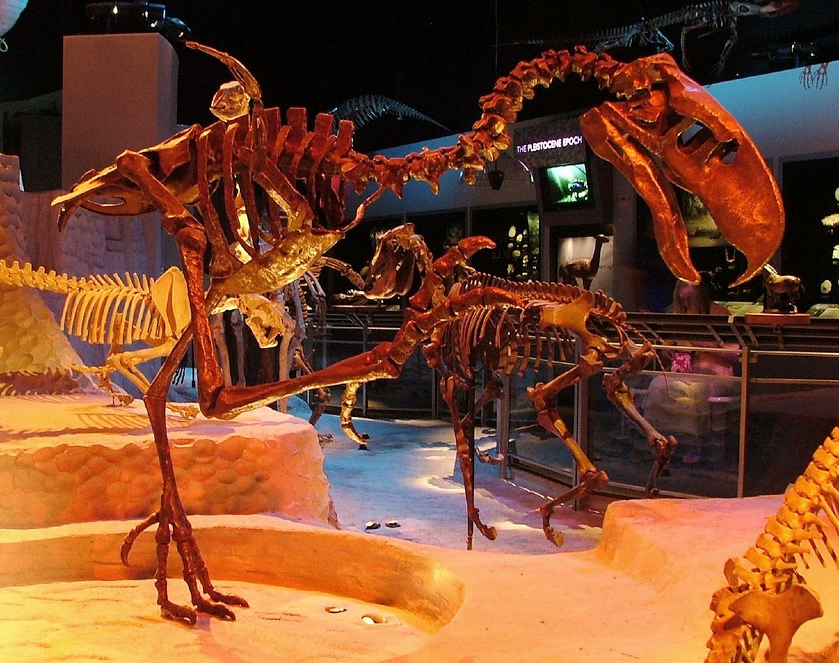
Reconstructed skeleton of Titanis mounted in a kicking pose, Florida Museum of Natural History

In 2005, Rudemar Ernesto Blanco and Washington W. Jones examined the strength of the tibiotarsus (shin bone) of phorusrhacids to determine their speed, but conceded that such estimates can be unreliable even for extant animals. While the tibiotarsal strength of Patagornis and an indeterminate large phorusrhacine suggested a speed of 14 m/s (50 km/h; 31 mph), and that of Mesembriornis suggested 27 m/s (97 km/h; 60 mph), the latter is greater than that of a modern ostrich, approaching that of a cheetah, 29 m/s (100 km/h; 65 mph). They found these estimates unlikely due to the large body size of these birds, and instead suggested the strength could have been used to break the long bones of medium-sized mammals, the size, for example, of a saiga or Thomson's gazelle. This strength could be used for accessing the marrow inside the bones, or by using the legs as kicking weapons (like some modern ground birds do), consistent with the large, curved, and sideways compressed claws known in some phorusrhacids. They also suggested future studies could examine whether they could have used their beaks and claws against well-armored mammals such as armadillos and glyptodonts.

According to Chiappe and Bertelli in 2006, the discovery of Kelenken shed doubt on the traditional idea that the size and agility of phorusrhacids correlated, with the larger members of the group being more bulky and less adapted for running. The long and slender tarsometatarsus of Kelenken instead shows that this bird may have been much swifter than the smaller, more heavyset and slow Brontornis. In a 2006 news article about the discovery, Chiappe stated that while Kelenken may not have been as swift as an ostrich, it could clearly run faster than had previously been assumed for large phorusrhacids, based on the long, slender leg-bones, superficially similar to those of the modern, flightless rhea. The article suggested that Kelenken would have been able to chase down small mammals and reptiles. In another 2006 news article about the find, the American paleontologist John J. Flynn commented that while there were other large predators in South America at the time, they were limited in numbers and not as fast and agile as the phorusrhacids, and the many grazing mammals would have provided ample prey. Phorusrhacids crudely resembled earlier predatory dinosaurs like Tyrannosaurus, in having gigantic heads, very small forelimbs, and very long legs, and thereby had the same kind of meat-eater adaptations.

==== Skull and neck function ====
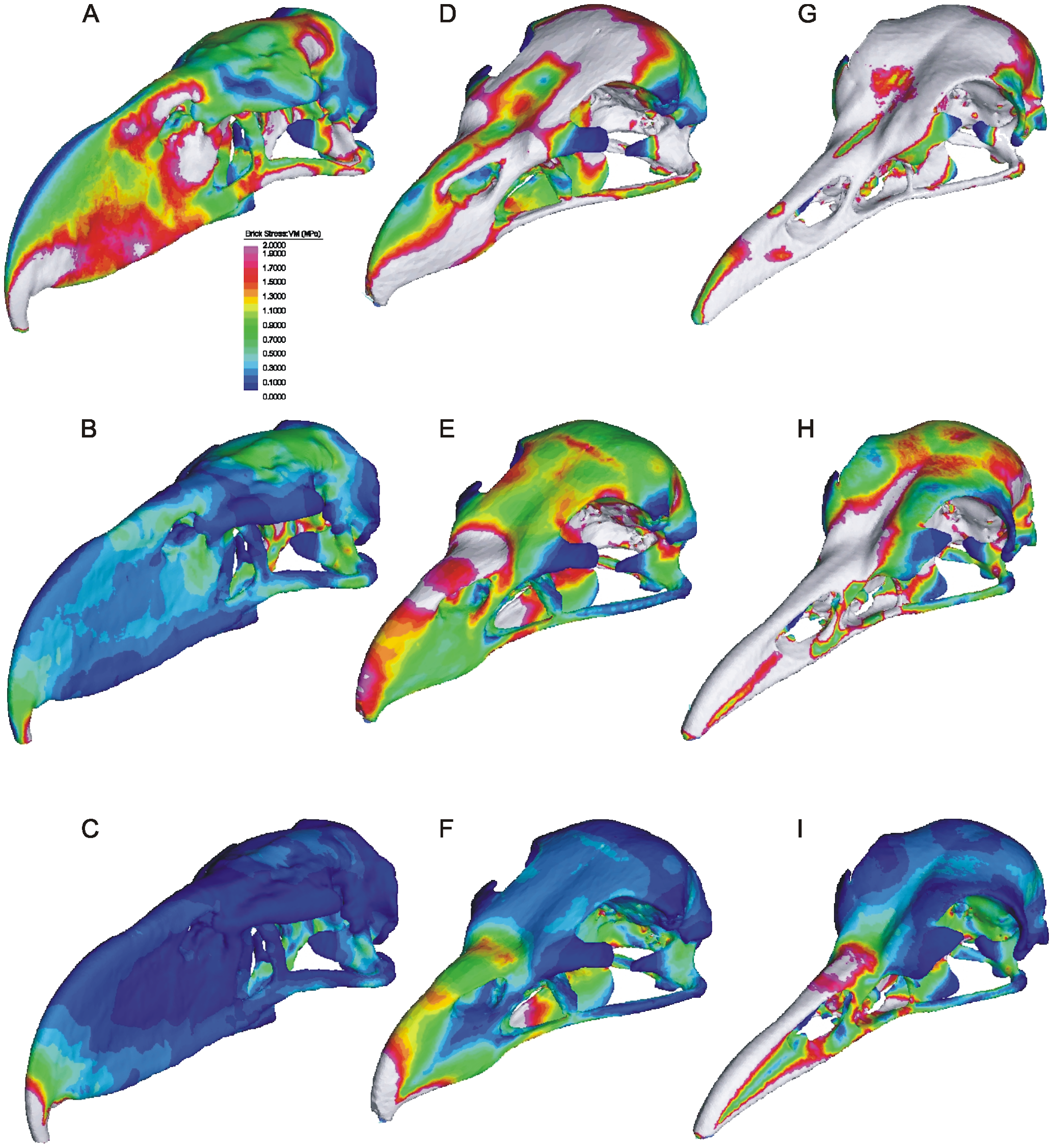
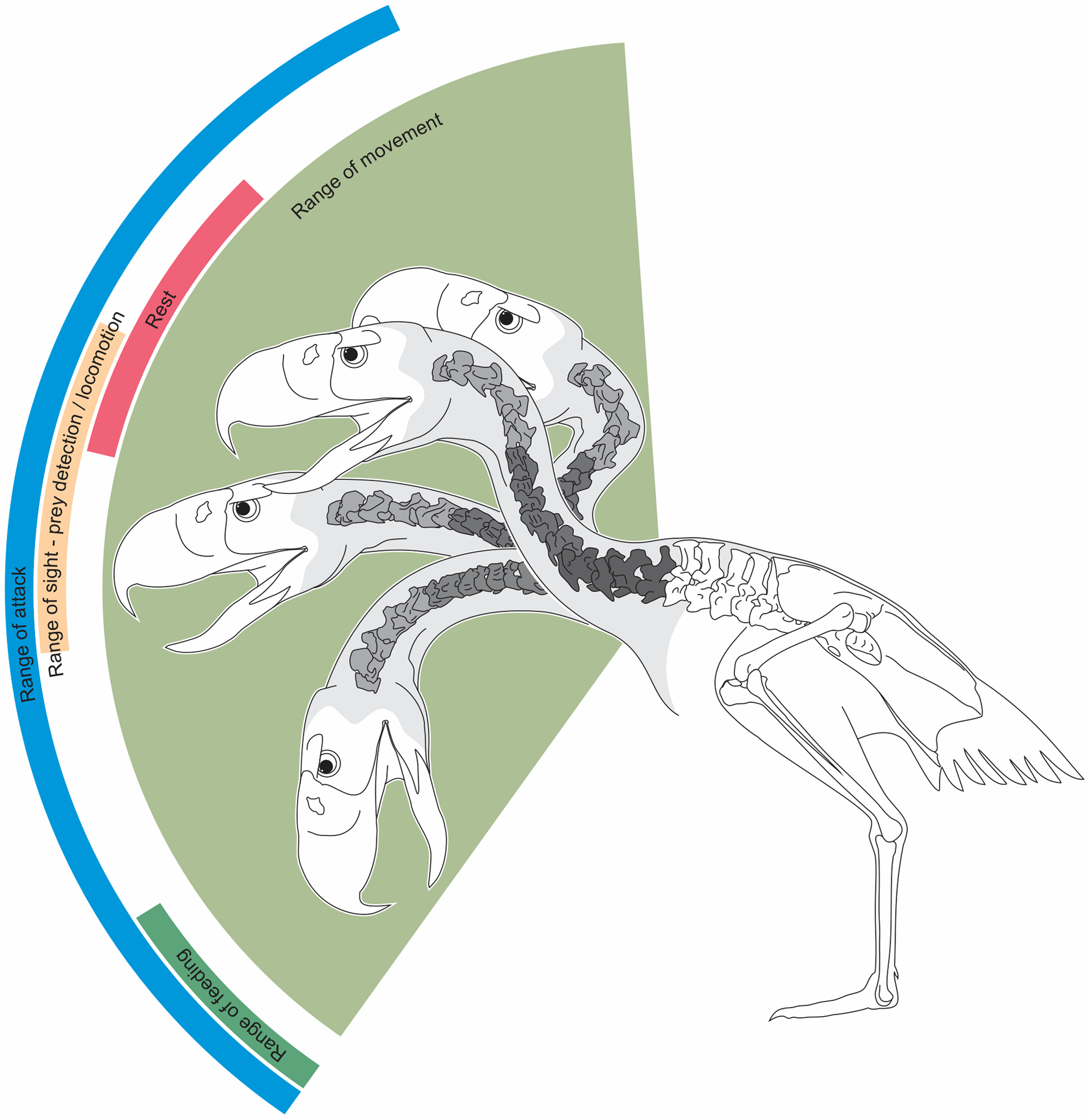
Stress distribution in bird skulls during various movements, including the related Andalgalornis (left, A–C, the other skulls belong to a white-tailed eagle, D-F, and a red-legged seriema, G-I), and hypothetical upwards-and-downwards range of movement of the neck in the same genus (right)

A 2010 study by Degrange and colleagues of the medium-sized phorusrhacid Andalgalornis, based on Finite Element Analysis using CT scans, estimated its bite force and stress distribution in its skull. They found its bite force to be 133 newtons at the bill tip, and showed it had lost a large degree of intracranial immobility (mobility of skull bones in relation to each other), as was also the case for other large phorusrhacids such as Kelenken. These researchers interpreted this loss as an adaptation for enhanced rigidity of the skull; compared to the modern red-legged seriema and white-tailed eagle, the skull of the phorusrhacid showed relatively high stress under sideways loadings, but low stress where force was applied up and down, and in simulations of "pullback". Due to the relative weakness of the skull at the sides and midline, these researchers considered it unlikely that Andalgalornis engaged in potentially risky behavior that involved using its beak to subdue large, struggling prey. Instead, they suggested that it either fed on smaller prey that could be killed and consumed more safely, by for example swallowing it whole, or that when targeting large prey, it used a series of well-targeted repetitive strikes with the beak, in an "attack-and-retreat" strategy. Struggling prey could also be restrained with the feet, despite the lack of sharp talons.

A 2012 follow-up study by Tambussi and colleagues analyzed the flexibility of the neck of Andalgalornis, based on the morphology of its neck vertebrae, finding the neck to be divided into three sections. By manually manipulating the vertebrae, they concluded that the neck musculature and skeleton of Andalgalornis was adapted to carrying a large head, and for helping it rise from a maximum extension after a downwards strike, and the researchers assumed the same would be true for other large, big-headed phorusrhacids. A 2020 study of phorusrhacid skull morphology by Degrange found that there were two main morphotypes within the group, derived from a seriema-like ancestor. These were the "Psilopterine Skull Type", which was plesiomorphic (more similar to the ancestral type), and the "Terror Bird Skull Type", which included Kelenken and other large members, that was more specialized, with more rigid and stiff skulls. Despite the differences, studies have shown the two types handled prey similarly, while the more rigid skulls and resulting larger bite force of the "Terror Bird" type would have been an adaptation to handling larger prey.

== Paleoenvironment ==
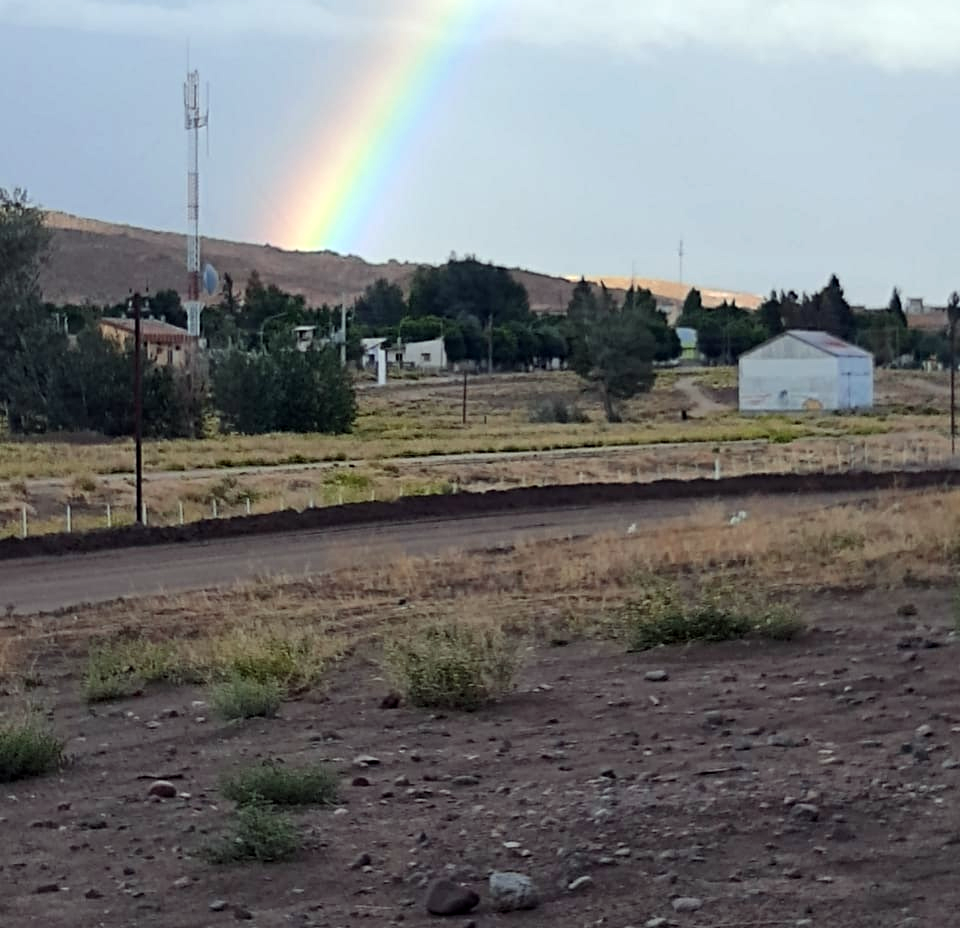
The holotype was found near the Comallo railroad.

Kelenken was discovered in pyroclastic (rocks ejected by volcanic eruptions) outcrops belonging to the Collón Curá Formation in the southeastern corner of Comallo, Patagonia, an area covered in whitish tuffs. The area's stratigraphy had only been preliminarily studied at the time, and the age of the sediments had not been adequately determined, but compared with other fossil beds of the South American land mammal age and radioisotopic dating from different areas of the Collón Curá Formation, it is estimated to date to the Colloncuran age of the middle Miocene, about 15 million years ago. The formation was accumulated in a broken foreland system characterized by several basins that were disconnected from each other. The formation is composed mainly of volcaniclastic limestones and sandstones that were accumulated in continental environments ranging from alluvial (deposited by running water) to lacustrine (deposited by lakes).

The Collón Curá Formation and the Colloncuran age of South America represent a time when more open environments with reduced plant covering predominated, similar to semi-arid and temperate to warm, dry woodlands or bushlands. The open environment allowed more cursorial (adapted for running) and large animals to occur, contrasting with the earlier conditions during the late Early Miocene, with its well-developed forests with tree-dwelling animals. Forests would then have been restricted to valleys of the cordillera mountain ranges, with few tree-dwelling species. This change happened progressively during the earlier Friasian stage. The transition towards more arid landscapes would have happened simultaneously with climate changes that corresponded to the Middle Miocene Climate Transition, a global cooling event which had a drying effect on continents.

The Collón Curá Formation of Argentina has provided a wide assemblage of mammals, including at least 24 taxa such as the xenarthrans Megathericulus, Prepotherium, Prozaedyus and Paraeucinepeltus, the notoungulate Protypotherium, the astrapothere Astrapotherium, the sparassodonts Patagosmilus and Cladosictis, the marsupial Abderites, the primate Proteropithecia, and rodents such as Maruchito, Protacaremys, Neoreomys and Prolagostomus. In addition to the mammals that characterize sediments of this age, there are also a few fossils of birds, reptiles, amphibians and fish.
