= Guiomys =

Guiomys Temporal range: Mid Miocene (Laventan) ~13.8–11.8 Ma

Scientific classification
- Domain: Eukaryota
- Kingdom: Animalia
- Phylum: Chordata
- Class: Mammalia
- Order: Rodentia
- Genus: †Guiomys; Pérez, 2010
- Species: †G. unica

Binomial name
- †Guiomys unica Pérez, 2010

Extinct genus of rodents

Guiomys is an extinct genus of cavioid rodent which lived in west central Patagonia of Argentina (Collón Curá Formation), Bolivia (Honda Group) and Peru (Yahuarango Formation) during the Middle Miocene (Laventan). Guiomys is known from mandibular and maxillary fragments with molars, and isolated cheek teeth. It was first named by María E. Pérez in 2010 and the type species is Guiomys unica.
