= Comallo =

Coordinates: 41°02′S 70°16′W

- Municipality and village
- Interactive map of Comallo
- Country: Argentina
- Province: Río Negro Province
- Time zone: UTC−3 (ART)
- Climate: Csb

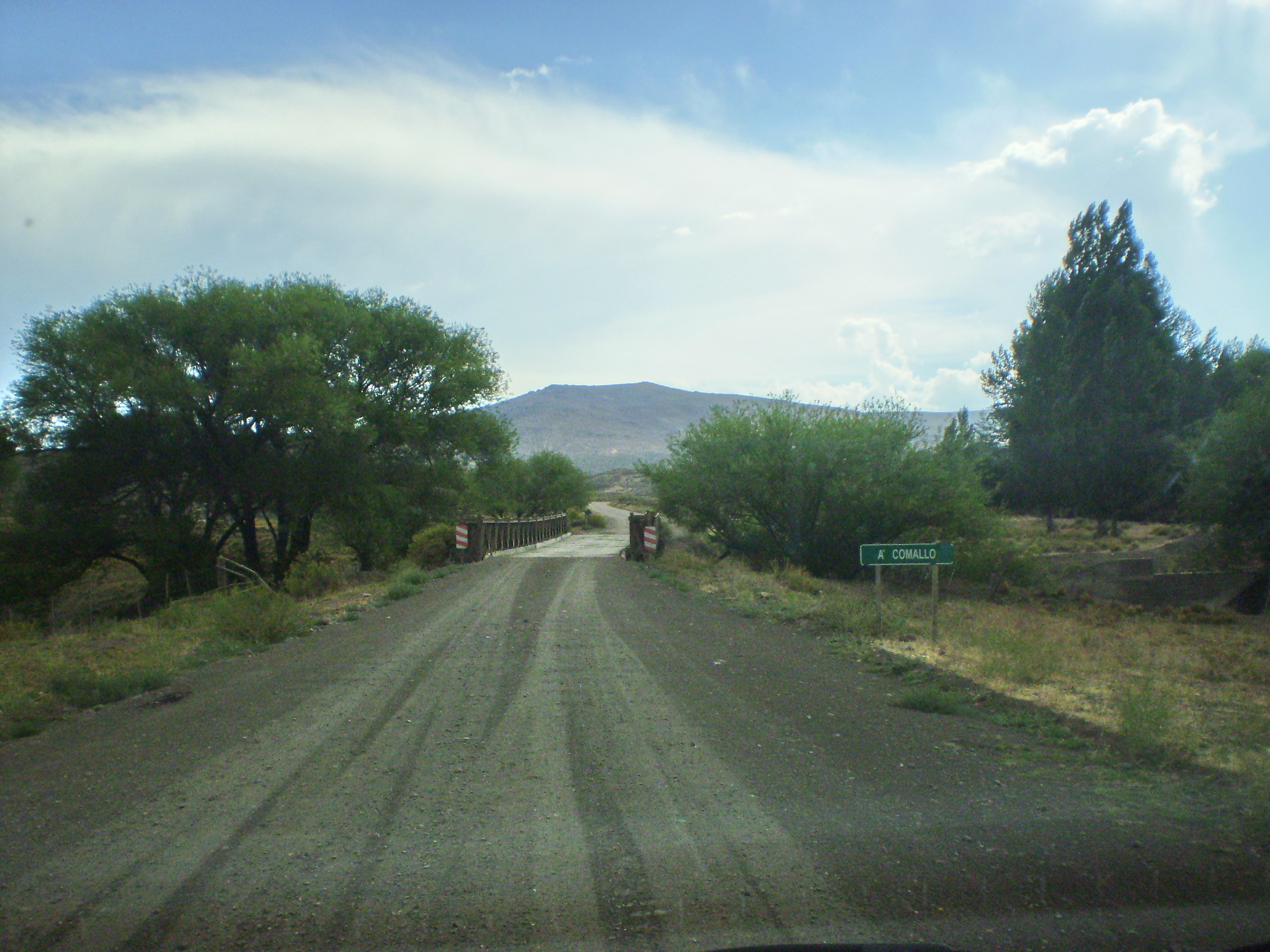
Comallo

Comallo is a village and municipality in Río Negro Province in Argentina.

== Climate ==
Climate data for Comallo, Río Negro (1973–1990)
Month	Jan	Feb	Mar	Apr	May	Jun	Jul	Aug	Sep	Oct	Nov	Dec	Year
Record high °C (°F)	35.0 (95.0)	35.0 (95.0)	33.0 (91.4)	29.0 (84.2)	20.0 (68.0)	19.0 (66.2)	17.0 (62.6)	18.0 (64.4)	26.0 (78.8)	29.0 (84.2)	33.0 (91.4)	33.0 (91.4)	33.0 (91.4)
Mean daily maximum °C (°F)	24.6 (76.3)	24.5 (76.1)	21.3 (70.3)	18.0 (64.4)	13.1 (55.6)	9.1 (48.4)	7.3 (45.1)	9.7 (49.5)	14.4 (57.9)	17.3 (63.1)	20.2 (68.4)	23.2 (73.8)	16.9 (62.4)
Daily mean °C (°F)	16.0 (60.8)	15.8 (60.4)	12.4 (54.3)	8.7 (47.7)	5.7 (42.3)	3.1 (37.6)	2.0 (35.6)	3.4 (38.1)	5.2 (41.4)	9.2 (48.6)	12.0 (53.6)	15.0 (59.0)	9.0 (48.2)
Mean daily minimum °C (°F)	4.7 (40.5)	4.5 (40.1)	1.0 (33.8)	−1.5 (29.3)	−2.3 (27.9)	−3.4 (25.9)	−4.2 (24.4)	−3.9 (25.0)	−3.9 (25.0)	−1.2 (29.8)	0.8 (33.4)	4.0 (39.2)	−0.5 (31.1)
Record low °C (°F)	−5.5 (22.1)	−4.0 (24.8)	−9.0 (15.8)	−13.0 (8.6)	−15.0 (5.0)	−25.0 (−13.0)	−16.0 (3.2)	−16.0 (3.2)	−18.0 (−0.4)	−11.0 (12.2)	−11.0 (12.2)	−5.0 (23.0)	−25.0 (−13.0)
Average precipitation mm (inches)	7.1 (0.28)	14.4 (0.57)	12.8 (0.50)	26.7 (1.05)	36.5 (1.44)	45.4 (1.79)	42.7 (1.68)	33.1 (1.30)	21.7 (0.85)	24.8 (0.98)	13.3 (0.52)	10.2 (0.40)	288.8 (11.37)
Average rainfall mm (inches)	7.1 (0.28)	14.4 (0.57)	12.8 (0.50)	26.7 (1.05)	34.3 (1.35)	32.0 (1.26)	33.0 (1.30)	28.6 (1.13)	19.0 (0.75)	23.1 (0.91)	13.3 (0.52)	10.3 (0.41)	254.6 (10.02)
Average snowfall cm (inches)	0.0 (0.0)	0.0 (0.0)	0.0 (0.0)	0.0 (0.0)	2.2 (0.9)	13.4 (5.3)	9.7 (3.8)	4.5 (1.8)	2.7 (1.1)	1.7 (0.7)	0.0 (0.0)	0.0 (0.0)	34.2 (13.5)
Average rainy days	1.1	1.6	1.2	4.0	5.2	5.2	4.8	4.4	3.2	3.0	2.8	2.0	38.5
Average snowy days	0.0	0.0	0.0	0.3	0.9	1.3	1.5	2.1	0.9	0.7	0.0	0.0	7.7
Source: Instituto Nacional de Tecnología Agropecuaria

== History ==
The only known specimen of Kelenken was discovered by high school student Guillermo Aguirre-Zabala in Comallo in 1999.
