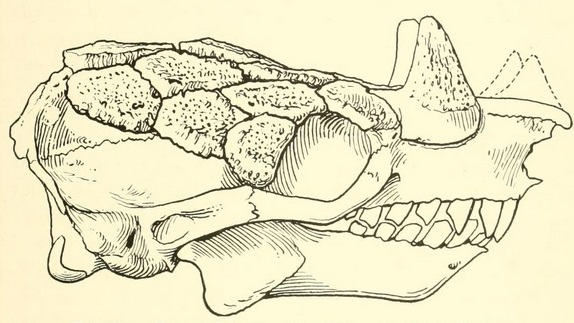
- Skull of Peltephilus

Scientific classification
- Kingdom: Animalia
- Phylum: Chordata
- Class: Mammalia
- Order: Cingulata
- Family: †Peltephilidae; Ameghino, 1894

Type species
- †Peltephilus strepens Ameghino, 1887

Genera
- †Anantiosodon; †Epipeltephilus; †Parapeltecoelus; †Peltecoelus; †Peltephilus; †Ronwolffia

= Peltephilidae =

Peltephilidae Temporal range: Early Eocene (Riochican) to late Miocene (Chasicoan), 57–9 Ma

Family of South American cingulates (armadillos)

Peltephilidae (meaning "armor-liking") is a family of South American cingulates (armadillos) that lived for over 40 million years, but peaked in diversity towards the end of the Oligocene and beginning of the Miocene in what is now Argentina. They were exclusive to South America due to its geographic isolation at the time, one of many of the continent's strange endemic families. Peltephilids are one of the earliest known cingulates, diverging from the rest of Cingulata in the Early Eocene.

== History of research ==
Fossils of peltephilids were first unearthed in the 1880s by Argentine paleontologist Carlos Ameghino, who had been searching for mammal remains in the Miocene-aged strata of the Santa Cruz Formation in Barrancas del Río Santa Cruz in Santa Cruz, Argentina. The outcrops that were visited had previously been mentioned by Francisco Moreno, who mentioned the discovery of cingulate fossils from the locale in 1882. The material recovered by Ameghino was later described by his brother Florentino, who was one of the most prolific paleontologists of the 19th century. Florentino Ameghino went on to name 11 species of armadillo based on the remains collected by Carlos, including two species of a new genus he dubbed called Peltephilus. The fossils were very fragmentary, consisting purely of unusual, isolated osteoderms (bony "scales" in the skin) that he believed were of a dasypodid. Even more strange osteoderms were found by Carlos in later expeditions to the exposures of the Santa Cruz Formation until, resulting in the discovery of a skull and associated osteoderms from Monte Observacion, which he dubbed Peltephilus ferox. Ameghino noted the strange nature of the skull, inspiring him to create the family Peltephilidae three years later.

Of the six established genera of peltephilid, four of them were named by Ameghino between 1887 and 1904. Since Ameghino's death, the genera Parapeltecoelus in 1938 and Ronwolffia in 2017 have been dubbed, both known from osteoderms and skull material.

== Classification ==
Peltephilids were not recognized as a distinct family of cingulates until 1894, when the discovery of several distinctly short, horned skulls in association with unusual osteoderms, which had been described previously as Peltephilus in 1887, was reported by Argentine paleontologist Florentino Ameghino. Since 1887, four more peltephilid genera represented by at least 12 species have been named, all of which are from the Cenozoic deposits of Argentina, Chile, and Bolivia. Several indeterminate fossils have also been mentioned in literature, including a Paleogene-aged find in Peru.

The family Peltephilidae is within the order Cingulata, which contains all pampatheres, pachyarmatheres, glyptodonts, and extant armadillo clades. Peltephilidae is theorized to have split off from the rest of Cingulata in the Paleocene, just after cingulates diverged from Pilosa and other xenarthrans in the Late Cretaceous.
