= Colloncuran =

Period of geologic time within the Middle Miocene epoch

The Colloncuran (Spanish: Colloncurense) age is a period of geologic time (15.5–13.8 Ma) within the Middle Miocene epoch of the Neogene, used more specifically within the SALMA classification in South America. It follows the Friasian and precedes the Laventan age.

== Etymology ==
The age is named after the Collón Curá Formation in the Cañadón Asfalto and Neuquén Basins of northern Patagonia, Argentina.

== Formations ==
Locations of Colloncuran formations

Formation bold is type	Country	Basin	Notes
Collón Curá Formation	Argentina	Cañadón Asfalto Basin; Neuquén Basin	
Castilletes Formation	Colombia	Cocinetas Basin	
Cura-Mallín Group	Chile	Cura-Mallín Basin	
Gran Bajo del Gualicho Formation	Argentina	Colorado Basin	
Nazareno Formation	Bolivia	Tupiza Basin	
Pebas Formation	Brazil; Colombia; Ecuador; Peru	Amazon Basin	
Pisco Formation	Peru	Pisco Basin	

== Fossils ==
Group	Fossils	Formation	Notes
Mammals	Abderites aisenense, Galileomys colloncurensis, Guiomys unica, Maruchito trilofodonte, cf. Microcardiodon williensis, Patagosmilus goini, Neosteiromys tordillense, ?Neotamandua australis, Propithecia neuquenensis, Protacaremys denisae, Protypotherium colloncurensis, Acarechimys sp., Alloiomys sp., cf. Arctodictis sp., Neoreomys sp., Prolagostomus sp., Cebidae indet., Dasyproctidae indet., Echimyidae indet., Eocardiidae indet., Erethizontidae indet., Stegotheriini indet.	Collón Curá	
Mammals	Lycopsis padillai, Hilarcotherium miyou, ?Hyperleptus sp., Astrapotheriidae, Odontoceti, Mysticeti, Glyptodontidae, Pampatheriidae, Macraucheniidae, Proterotheriidae, Leontinidae, Toxodontidae, Interatheriidae, Megatheriidae, Dinomyidae, Sirenia, Sparassodonta	Castilletes	
Mammals	Hegetotherium cerdasensis, Juchuysillu arenalesensis, "Plesiotypotherium" minus, Acarechimys sp., Diadiaphorus sp., ?Neothoracophorus sp., cf. Peltephilus sp., Plesiotypotherium sp., Prolagostomus sp., Propalaehoplophorus sp., Proterotherium sp., Stenotatus sp., ?Acrocyon sp., cf. Xyophorus sp., ?Astrapotheriidae indet., ?Borhyaenidae indet., Chinchillinae n sp., Euphractini indet., Eutatini indet., Interatheriinae indet., Macraucheniidae indet., Megatheriinae indet., Octodontidae indet., Toxodontidae indet.	Nazareno	
Mammals	Chavinziphius maxillocristatus, Chimuziphius coloradensis, Incakujira anillodefuego, Messapicetus gregarius, Brachydelphis sp., Monachinae indet., Phocidae indet.	Pisco	
Birds	Kelenken guillermoi	Collón Curá	
Birds	Aves indet.	Castilletes	
Birds	?Phorusrhacidae indet.	Nazareno	
Birds	Sulidae indet.	Pisco	
Reptiles	Chelonoidis gringorum, Waincophis australis, Boinae indet., Lacertilia indet.	Collón Curá	
Reptiles	Chelus colombiana, Chelonoidis sp., cf. Crocodylus sp., cf. Mourasuchus sp., cf. Purussaurus sp., Alligatoridae indet., Boidae indet., Crocodylidae indet., Eusuchia indet., Gavialoidea indet., Podocnemididae indet.	Castilletes	
Reptiles	?Testudinidae indet.	Nazareno	
Reptiles	Pacifichelys urbinai	Pisco	
Fishes	Megalodon, Characidae, Serrasalmidae, Sciaenidae, Sparidae, Sphyraenidae, Ariidae, Callichthyidae, Doradidae, Pimelodidae, Carcharhinidae, Hemigaleidae, Sphyrnidae, Lamnidae, Otodontidae, Dasyatidae, Myliobatidae, Rhinopteridae, Ginglymostomatidae, Pristiophoridae, Pristidae, Rhynchobatidae, Rhynobatidae, Lepidosirenidae	Castilletes	
Fishes	Nematogenys cuivi	Cura-Mallín	
Fishes	Megalodon, Carcharhinus cf. albimarginatus, Carcharhinus cf. brachyurus, Carcharodon hastalis, Galeocerdo cf. contortus, Hemipristis serra, Isurus sp.	Pisco	
