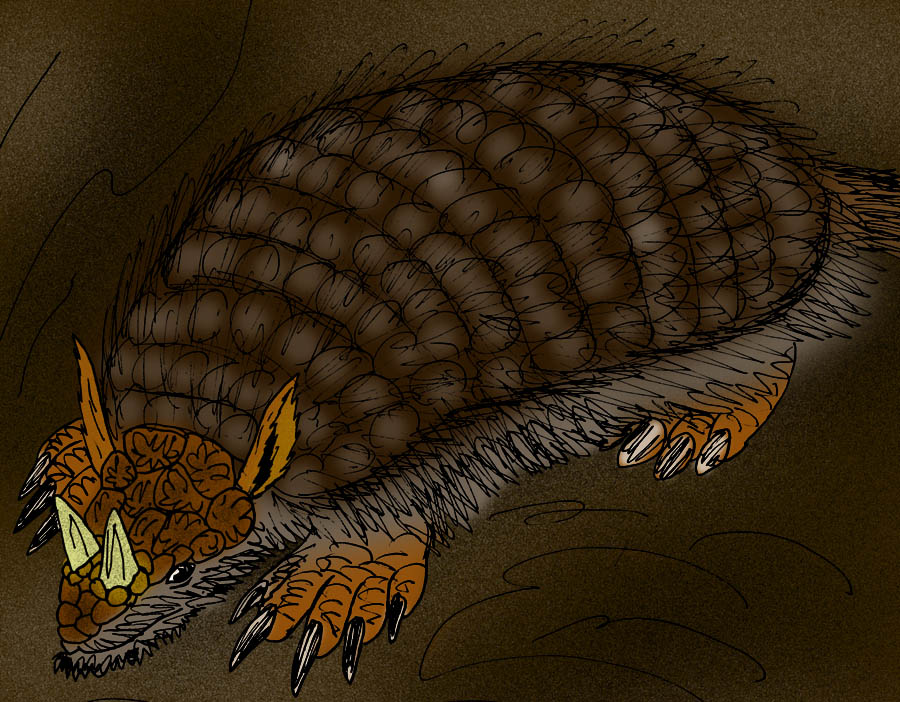
- Interpretation of P. ferox

Scientific classification
- Kingdom: Animalia
- Phylum: Chordata
- Class: Mammalia
- Order: Cingulata
- Family: †Peltephilidae
- Genus: †Peltephilus; Ameghino 1887

Type species
- †Peltephilus ferox Ameghino 1887

Species
- P. depressus Ameghino 1897; P. ferox Ameghino 1891 (type); P. giganteus Ameghino 1894; P. granosus Ameghino 1902; P. protervus Ameghino 1897; P. pumilus Ameghino 1887; P. quebradensis Ciancio, Pujos & Cerdeño, 2025; P. strepens Ameghino 1887; P. undulatus Ameghino 1897

= Peltephilus =

Peltephilus Temporal range: Oligocene-Mid Miocene (Deseadan-Mayoan) ~29.0–11.6 Ma

Extinct genus of mammals

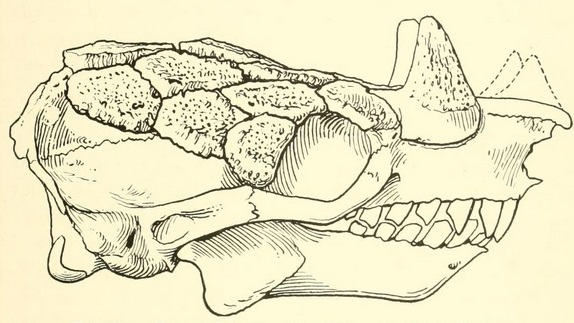
Skull of P. ferox

Peltephilus, the horned armadillo, is an extinct genus of armadillo xenarthran mammals that first inhabited Argentina during the Oligocene epoch, and became extinct in the Miocene epoch. Notably, the scutes on its head were so developed that they formed horns. Aside from the horned gophers of North America, it is the only known fossorial horned mammal.

== Description ==
P. ferox had a skull about 11.7 centimetres (4.6 in) long, and its estimated body mass is around 11.07 kilograms (24.4 lb).

The upper teeth on the anterior side of the skull were sharp, and they passed outside the lower teeth when the jaw was shut. The teeth of Peltephilus were covered in dentin. Visually, it looks as if Peltephilus had a full set of incisors, though they only bore one on each side, like modern armadillos. The centre of the molariform teeth was formed by degenerated linear osteodentine. The orthodentine contained odontoblastic processes with abundant short extensions and reached the outer surfaces. Cementum was absent from the teeth.

== Taxonomy ==
The genus was originally classified as belonging to the family Chlamyphoridae, but in 2007 was placed in its own family Peltephilidae by Darin A. Croft, John J. Flynn and Andre Wyss.

== Palaeobiology ==
=== Palaeoecology ===
Although it had traditionally been perceived as a carnivore because of its large, triangular-shaped teeth, Vizcaino and Fariña argued in 1997 that Peltephilus was a herbivore.

== Distribution ==
Fossils of Peltephilus have been found in:

Deseadan

- Argentina – Sarmiento Formation
- Bolivia – Salla Formation

Miocene

- Argentina – Colloncuran Collón Curá Formation and Santacrucian Santa Cruz Formation
- Bolivia – Colloncuran Nazareno Formation
- Chile – Santacrucian Chucal Formation
