= Prosotherium =

Prosotherium Temporal range: Late Oligocene (Deseadan) ~29–21 Ma
- Prosotherium garzoni (=Propachyrucos ameghinorum). Collected from Chubut province, Argentina.

Scientific classification
- Kingdom: Animalia
- Phylum: Chordata
- Class: Mammalia
- Order: †Notoungulata
- Family: †Hegetotheriidae
- Subfamily: †Pachyrukhinae
- Genus: †Prosotherium; Ameghino, 1897

Type species
- †Prosotherium garzoni Ameghino, 1897

Species
- P. garzoni Ameghino, 1897

Synonyms
- List: Prosotherium triangulidens Ameghino, 1897; Prosotherium robustum Ameghino, 1897; Prosotherium quartum Ameghino, 1901; Propachyrucos ameghinorum Simpson, 1945; Propachyrucos simpsoni Chaffee, 1952

Extinct genus of notoungulates

Prosotherium is an extinct genus of late Oligocene hegetotheriid notoungulate. It has been found in two Argentinian fossil formations, ie, the Sarmiento Formation in Chubut Province, and the Agua de la Piedra Formation in Mendoza Province.

== Taxonomy ==
The genus Prosotherium was first described in 1897 by Florentino Ameghino, over fossilized remains discovered in Patagonia in Late Oligocene terrains. The type species is Prosotherium garzoni, and Ameghino described in this same paper P. triangulidens, which was a bit larger than the type species, as well as P. robustum. P. quartum, a fourth species, was described in 1901 by Ameghino. Only Prosotherium garzoni is still considered valid.

Prosotherium was a member of the Hegetotheriidae, a clade of light, rodent-like or hare-like Notoungulata. Prosotherium was a member of the Pachyrukhinae subfamily comprising several hare-like genera. It is possible that Prosotherium was an ancestral form or a close relative of Paedotherium, more specialized.

In a 1999 unpublished Ph.D. dissertation, the Propachyrucos species P. ameghinorum and P. simpsoni were synonymized with Prosotherium garzoni. This was supported by a 2019 reassessment as well as a number of other studies. This means Prosotherium garzoni is known from an almost complete specimen, ie, the holotype of Pr. ameghinorum. The 2019 study recovers the features of P. ameghinorum as consistent with those of juvenile Prosotherium garzoni (although the holotype of P. ameghinorum was not directly examined). Despite this, until 2019, phylogenetic analyses regularly scored Propachyrucos for cranial and post-cranial characters, which are known only from the synonymized P. ameghinorum and P. simpsoni.

== Description ==
This animal was similar to rabbits, in aspect and in size. Compared to its relatives, it would have been about 20% larger than Propachyrucos, Pachyrukhos, and Paedotherium, but slightly smaller than Medistyllus. Its hind legs were particularly long.

=== Crania ===
Closeup of AMNH 29574, the holotype of "Propachyrucos ameghinorum". Collected in Chubut province, Argentina.

Its skull was light and thin, notably in the posterior part. The tympanic part of the temporal bone was particularly developed, even more than its relative Pachyrukhos, and it is probable that its auricle was quite large, similar to the ears of a hare. The maxilla and the mandible were high and deep; the mandible had a subtle coronoid process. The teeth were characterized by incisors pointing inward, molars and premolars covered by a thin layer of dental cementum, generally on the outside part of the upper teeth and on the inside part of the lower teeth.

The skull had a complete dentition, but the second and third incisors, as well as the canines and the first lower premolars, were vestigial. The first upper incisors were very large, and showed considerable development.

=== Postcranial skeleton ===
The humerus was large and thin, like the ulna and radius. Metacarpals and phalanges indicates that the hand was small and delicate. The pelvis was elongated, slender and lightly build, while the femur was equipped of a small head separated from the main bone. The femur was even longer than in Pachyrukhos, and had a small trochanter curiously pushed back in the posterior part. Contrary to Pachyrukhos, the tibia and fibula were completely separated. The talus bone was likewise characteristic, with the trochlear nerve extant covering entirely the dorsal part of the bone, and a low and flat condylar crest. The calcaneus was relatively small, with an articulated facet for the cuboid bone slightly concave and occupying the entire distal part of the bone. The metatarsal was robust and shorter than in Pachyrukhos. The distal phalanx was high and narrow, flattening and widening towards the terminal part.

Its body was slender, with a very short tail and strong forelegs, although much shorter than the hind legs, equipped with long metatarsals.

The tibia and fibula were not fused, and the forearm and lower leg bones were respectively shorter than the humerus and femur, but the hind legs were much longer than the forelegs. The second and third fingers of the hand were of similar length, and the fourth was smaller; the fifth finger was small, even smaller than in its relative Pachyrukhos. The hand seems more specialized than in Pachyrukhos, and shares similarities with that of Paedotherium. The metatarsals were elongated, especially the third.

Skeleton

Skull

== Paleobiology ==
The Late Oligocene terrains of Patagonia present at least three genera of hegetotheres with hypsodont teeth : Prosotherium, Propachyrucos and Medistylus, the latter of which is sometimes considered an interatheriid. This implies a strict repartition of ecological niches among the Oligocene hegetotheres, but also reflects the remarkable evolutionary radiation of rodent-like ungulates during the Cenozoic of South America, and suggest environmental differences between the fauna of Patagonia and the fauna of Uruguay and Bolivia, where those animals were absent.
