= Friasian =

South American land mammal age (SALMA)

The Friasian age is a period of geologic time (16.3–15.5 Ma) within the Early Miocene epoch of the Neogene, used more specifically within the SALMA classification of South America. It follows the Santacrucian and precedes the Colloncuran age.

== Etymology ==
The age is named after the Río Frías Formation in the Aysén Basin, Patagonia, Chile.

== Formations ==
Locations of Friasian formations

Formation bold is type	Country	Basin	Notes
Río Frías Formation	Chile	Aysén Basin	
Castilletes Formation	Colombia	Cocinetas Basin	
Cerdas Beds	Bolivia	Altiplano Basin	
Chilcatay Formation	Peru	Pisco Basin	
Cura-Mallín Group	Chile	Cura-Mallín Basin	
Gran Bajo del Gualicho Formation	Argentina	Colorado Basin	
Parángula Formation	Venezuela	Barinas-Apure Basin	
Pebas Formation	Brazil; Colombia; Ecuador; Peru	Amazon Basin	
Río Foyel Formation	Argentina	Patagonian Andes	
Río Yuca Formation	Venezuela	Barinas-Apure Basin	

== Fossils ==
Group	Fossils	Formation	Notes
Mammals	Abderites aisenense, A. meridionalis, Alloiomys friasensis, Astrapotherium hesperinum, Borhyaena tuberata, Cladosictis patagonica, Megathericulus friasensis, Microbiotherium tehuelchum, Parabderites bicrispatus, Palaeothentes intermedius, P. lemoinei, P. minutus, Pichipilus halleuxi, Pitheculites rothi, Prothylacinus patagonicus, Prototrigodon rothi, Sipalocyon gracilis, Adinotherium sp., Homalodotherium sp., Neonematherium sp., Nesodon sp., Pachyrukhos sp., Phoenixauchenia sp., ?Propalaehoplophorus sp., Protypotherium sp., Prozaedyus sp., Theosodon sp., Trachytypotherium sp., Platyrrhini indet.	Río Frías	
Mammals	Lycopsis padillai, ?Hyperleptus sp., Astrapotheriidae, Odontoceti, Mysticeti, Glyptodontidae, Pampatheriidae, Macraucheniidae, Proterotheriidae, Leontinidae, Toxodontidae, Interatheriidae, Megatheriidae, Dinomyidae, Sirenia, Sparassodonta	Castilletes	
Mammals	Hegetotherium cerdasensis, Juchuysillu arenalesensis, Llullataruca cf. shockeyi, Microtypotherium cf. choquecotense, Protypotherium cf. attenuatum, "Plesiotypotherium" minus, Palyeidodon obtusum, Mcdonaldocnus bondesioi, Borhyaenoidea indet., Euphractini indet., Lagostominae indet., Macraucheniidae indet., Megatheriinae indet., Mesotheriinae indet., Peltephilidae indet., Uruguaytheriinae indet.	Cerdas	
Mammals	Adinotherium sp., Peltephilidae indet.	Río Yuca	
Reptiles	Chelus colombiana, Chelonoidis sp., cf. Crocodylus sp., cf. Mourasuchus sp., cf. Purussaurus sp., Alligatoridae indet., Boidae indet., Eusuchia indet., Gavialoidea indet., Podocnemididae indet.	Castilletes	
Reptiles	Barinasuchus arveloi	Parángula	
Reptiles	Purussaurus sp.	Río Yuca	
Birds	Aves indet.	Castilletes	
Birds	Palaeospheniscus bergi, Spheniscidae indet.	Río Foyel	
Fish	Megalodon, Characidae, Serrasalmidae, Sciaenidae, Sparidae, Sphyraenidae, Ariidae, Callichthyidae, Doradidae, Pimelodidae, Carcharhinidae, Hemigaleidae, Sphyrnidae, Lamnidae, Otodontidae, Dasyatidae, Myliobatidae, Rhinopteridae, Ginglymostomatidae, Pristiophoridae, Pristidae, Rhynchobatidae, Rhynobatidae, Lepidosirenidae	Castilletes	
Fish	Carcharodon hastalis	Río Foyel	
Fish	Phractocephalus sp., Platysilurus sp.	Río Yuca	
