= Typotheriopsis =

Typotheriopsis Temporal range: Late Miocene (Mayoan-Huayquerian) ~11.6–6.8 Ma.

Scientific classification
- Kingdom: Animalia
- Phylum: Chordata
- Class: Mammalia
- Order: †Notoungulata
- Family: †Mesotheriidae
- Subfamily: †Mesotheriinae
- Genus: †Typotheriopsis; Cabrera & Kraglievich, 1931

Type species
- †Typotheriopsis chasicoensis

Species
- T. chasicoensis (Cabrera & Kraglievich, 1931); T. silveyrai Cabrera, 1937

Synonyms
- Typotheriopsis vanhouttei Cattoi, 1943; Typotheriopsis jachalensis Rusconi, 1947

Extinct genus of mammals

Typotheriopsis is an extinct genus of Notoungulate belonging to the family Mesotheriidae, which included several small Meridiungulates specialized in digging. It is considered as the sister taxon of the clade including Mesotherium and Pseudotypotherium. Its fossils are known from the Chasicoan and the Huayquerian periods, notably among Late Miocene rocks from the Arroyo Chasicó Formation and the Cerro Azul Formation of Argentina.

== Description ==
Typotheriopsis chasicoensis was described in 1931 by Ángel Cabrera and Lucas Kraglievich, with a holotype composed of badly preserved cranial remains from the Arroyo Chasicó Formation of Argentina. Those remains were similar to Pseudotypotherium, but included thicker enamel and less rudimentary incisors than in other genera of mesotherid. Later studies expanded this list of differences between Typotheriopsis and Pseudotypotherium. It was large for a mesothere, with a wide skull, and a suborbital fossa on its eye socket which may have hosted a scent gland.
