= Ethegotherium =

Ethegotherium Temporal range: Middle-Late Miocene ~18–14 Ma

Scientific classification
- Domain: Eukaryota
- Kingdom: Animalia
- Phylum: Chordata
- Class: Mammalia
- Order: †Notoungulata
- Family: †Hegetotheriidae
- Genus: †Ethegotherium; Minoprio, 1947
- Species: †E. carettei

Binomial name
- †Ethegotherium carettei Minoprio, 1947

Extinct genus of notoungulates

Ethegotherium is an extinct genus of Notoungulates, belonging to the suborder Typotheria. It lived from the Lower to the Middle Miocene, and its fossilized remains were discovered in South America. It might be a synonym of the genus Prohegetotherium.

== Description ==
This was a small animal, not exceeding the size of a European rabbit. Ethegotherium is only known from a skull and a mandible, and it is difficult to restore its complete appearance. From comparison with its relatives, it can be supposed that it was a small notoungulate with a short tail and long hind legs. It shared similarities with the slightly older Prohegetotherium, but differed from it in several ways, including its smaller size.

The incisors and canines were directed forward, giving rise to a "false diastema" between them and the backward-directed first premolars. The upper canine had an arched crown, while the upper jugal teeth, with a high crown, were slightly imbricated, without any development of the parastyle area and with discontinuous enamel. Unlike Prohegetotherium, the first upper premolar had no labial sulcus nor parastyle, while the second premolar had a deep lingual sulcus and the third premolar was quite large. For the lower molars, the trigonid was rounded and not cordiform like in Prohegetotherium.

== Classification ==
Ethegotherium was a member of the Hegetotheriidae, a group of small-sized Notoungulates, similar in appearance to lagomorphs. The dental characteristics of this animal indicates affinities with Prohegetotherium and Hegetotherium, within the Hegetotheriinae subfamily.

The holotype of Ethegotherium carettei was first described in 1947 by José Luis Minoprio, based on fossils found in the Mendoza Province of Argentina, and firstly attributed to the genus Prohegetotherium as P. carettei. Later, a study by George Gaylord Simpson, Bryan Patterson and Minoprio himself identified several sufficiently distinctive characteristics for the establishment of a new genus, Ethegotherium (whose name is the anagram of Hegetotherium). However, there is still some debate on the exact generic attribution of the fossils. It was initially thought to have come from the Divisadero Largo Formation of the Late Eocene, but further analyses of the rock matrix of the fossil tends to indicate that the holotype came from the Miocene Mariño Formation.

== References and Bibliography ==
- Minoprio, J. L. (1947): Fósiles de la Formación Divisadero Largo. – Anales Sociedad Científica Argentina, 144: 365–378.
- Simpson, G. G., Minoprio, J. L. & Patterson, B. (1962): The mammalian fauna of the Divisadero Largo Formation. Mendoza, Argentina. – Bulletin of the Museum of Comparative Zoology, 127: 239–293.
- Lopez, G. M. (2002): Redescripción de Ethegotherium carettei (Notoungulata, Hegetotheriidae) de la Formación Divisadero Largo de la provincia de Mendoza, Argentina. – Ameghiniana, 39 (3): 295–306.
