= Chichinales Formation =

Geological formation in Argentina

- Stratigraphic range: Chattian-Burdigalian (Deseadan-Colhuehuapian); ~23–17.5 Ma
- Underlies: El Palo Formation
- Overlies: Roca Formation
- Thickness: 90 m (300 ft)

Lithology
- Primary: Sandstone, mudstone
- Other: Limestone

Location
- Coordinates: 39.1°S 67.8°W
- Approximate paleocoordinates: 39.8°S 62.2°W
- Region: Río Negro Province
- Country: Argentina
- Extent: Neuquén Basin

Type section
- Named for: Chichinales

The Chichinales Formation is a geological formation in Río Negro Province, Argentina which dates from the Late Oligocene to the Early Miocene, around 23 to 17.5 million years ago. It predominantly consists of pyroclastic deposits, which were deposited in a semi-arid environment. It is divided up into a number of members. The diverse fauna of the Chichinales Formation, including a variety of turtles and birds, also includes many mammals such as South American native ungulates (notoungulates and litopterns) as well as armadillos, and caviomorph rodents.

It is named after the type locality and extends over a large part of the province of Río Negro. It outcrops in the valle de Río Negro, in the towns of General Roca, Río Negro and Villa Regina, bordering the southern bank of the Río Negro. Part of the most important outcrops are located within the Paso Córdova Natural Protected Area.

The Chichinales Formation, broadly speaking, is made up of grayish sandstones, whitish tuffs, siltstones and greenish claystones with paleo soil levels. It is divided into 3 members: lower, middle and upper. The lower one is composed of grayish brown sandstones with low-angle cross bedding, alternating with light brown tuffs, tuffaceous sandstones, sandstones with carbonate cement and shales. In this member, the presence of "opalized" fossil logs is common. The middle member is formed by paleosols and sequences of siltstones, shales and fine sands that in some sectors form lenses in the form of fluvial channels. Finally, the upper member is represented by more homogeneous levels of tuffs, whitish gray tuffites, siltstones, green claystones and tuffaceous sandstones This member, in some sectors, is laterally interdigitated with marginal marine levels of the Gran Bajo del Gualicho Formation, which dates from the Late Oligocene to the Early Pliocene. The Chichinales Formation is correlated with the contemporaneous fluvial and lacustrine tuffaceous Collón Curá Formation of the central Neuquén Basin.

The sedimentological and paleontological evidence provided by the Chichinales Formation suggests the existence of open environments with low relief, restricted wooded areas with temporary water bodies and warm temperate climate, in agreement with other Colhuehuapian localities of Chubut Province. In this context, it is possible to interpret, at least tentatively, that the differences between the set of taxa represented in the Cerro Bandera Formation and those of the Chichinales Formation are due to contrasts between the local environmental conditions of each unit rather than to differences in temporal range. It is likely that such differences are the result of the particular conditions that prevailed in the Neuquén region during the Early Miocene, which would be a consequence of its proximity to the Andean zone rather than its latitudinal location.

== Paleoflora ==
Name	Species	Member/Locality	Material	Notes	Image
Nothofagus	N. menendezii				

== Paleofauna ==
=== Reptiles ===
==== Lepidosaurs ====
Name	Species	Member	Material	Notes	Image
Callopistes	C. rionegrensis				

==== Crocodylomorphs ====
Name	Species	Member	Material	Notes	Image
Crocodyliformes indet.	Currently undescribed		Isolated fragment of the posterior region of the skull roof.		

==== Testudines ====
Name	Species	Member	Material	Notes	Image
Chelonoidis	C. cf. gringorum				
Geochelone	G. sp.				

=== Birds ===
Name	Species	Member	Material	Notes	Image
Charadriiformes indet.	Currently undescribed				
Opisthodactylus	O. horacioperezi				
Patagorhacos	P. terrificus				
Phorusrhacidae indet.	Currently undescribed		Distal extremity of tibiotarsus		

=== Mammals ===
==== Meridiungulates ====
Name	Species	Material	Notes	Image
Cochilius	C. volvens		An interatheriid	
Colpodon	C. sp.	Several maxillary remains		
Cramauchenia	C. sp.		A macraucheniid	
Hegetotheriopsis	H. sulcatus		A hegetotheriid	
Hegetotherium	H. sp.			
Interatheriidae indet.	Currently undescribed	Mandibular and maxillary fragment		
Mesotheriidae indet.	Currently undescribed			
Proterotheriidae indet.	Currently undescribed	Maxillary and mandibular fragment		
Protypotherium	P. sp.		An interatheriid	
Toxodontidae indet.	Currently undescribed	Left and right mandibular fragments with incomplete series of teeth		

==== Xenarthrans ====
Name	Species	Member	Material	Notes	Image
Glyptodontinae indet.	Currently undescribed				
Proeutatus	P. sp.				
Stenotatus	cf. S. sp.				

==== Rodents ====
Name	Species	Member	Material	Notes	Image
Australoprocta	A. fleaglei				
Caviocricetus	C. lucasi				
Echimyidae indet.	Currently undescribed				
Eoviscaccia	E. australis				
Octodontoidea indet.	Currently undescribed				
Willidewu	W. esteparius				

==== Metatherians ====
Name	Species	Member	Material	Notes	Image
Cladosictis	C. cf. patagonica		Complete right maxillary fragment		
