= Propachyrucos =

Propachyrucos Temporal range: Late Oligocene-Early Miocene ~29–21 Ma

Scientific classification
- Kingdom: Animalia
- Phylum: Chordata
- Class: Mammalia
- Order: †Notoungulata
- Family: †Hegetotheriidae
- Genus: †Propachyrucos; Ameghino, 1897
- Species: †P. smithwoodwardi

Binomial name
- †Propachyrucos smithwoodwardi Ameghino, 1897

Extinct genus of notoungulates

Propachyrucos is an extinct genus of late Oligocene hegetotheriid notoungulate. It is known from a few mandibular fragments from the Sarmiento Formation, Chubut Province, Argentina.

== Taxonomy ==
Propachyrucos was first described in 1897 by Florentino Ameghino, based on a right mandible fragment found in Oligocene terrains of the Sarmiento Formation in Argentina, initially believed by Ameghino to have been Cretaceous. The type species is Propachyrucos smithwoodwardi, but other species have been attributed to the genus, such as P. aequilatus, P. robustus, and P. ameghinorum, the latter species, described in 1945 by George Gaylord Simpson from fossils found in the Chubut Province, is known from a remarkably complete skeleton, permitting to reconstruct the animal appearance with high precision. However, recent researches tend to indicate that all the other species of Propachyrucos are in fact synonymous with the type species.

Propachyrucos was a hegetothere, a group of notoungulates that evolved in isolation on the South American continent, giving rise to forms resembling hares and rabbits. Propachyrucos was a member of Pachyrukhinae, a subfamily of hegetotheres particularly similar to modern lagomorphs.

In a 1999 unpublished Ph.D. dissertation, the Propachyrucos species P. ameghinorum and P. simpsoni were synonymized with Prosotherium garzoni. This was supported by a 2019 reassessment as well as a number of other studies. As the most well preserved specimen of Propachyrucos was previously the nearly complete holotype of P. ameghinorum, Propachyrucos smithwoodwardi is now only known from a few mandibular fragments. The 2019 study recovers the features of P. ameghinorum as consistent with those of juvenile Prosotherium garzoni (although the holotype of P. ameghinorum was not directly examined). Despite this, until 2019, phylogenetic analyses regularly scored Propachyrucos for cranial and post-cranial characters, which are known only from the synonymized P. ameghinorum and P. simpsoni.

== Description ==
Propachyrucos may have been similar to the rabbit-sized Prosotherium, but was almost 20% smaller, more similar in size to Pachyrukhos and Paedotherium, and almost 30% larger than Tremacyllus.

The molars had two internal folds separated by a further deep fold, like the Interatheriidae; dental cementum was present, but to a lesser extent than in Interatherium. The lower teeth were flat on the outside and bilobed on the inside.

== Paleoecology ==
Propachyrucos and its relatives were animals well suited to running and jumping. Body proportions similar to those of Propachyrucos's relatives can also be found in the Cainotheriidae, a group of artiodactyls from the Oligocene-Miocene of Europe.

== References and bibliography ==
- F. Ameghino. 1897. Mamiferos Cretaceos de la Argentina. Segunda contribucion al conocimiento de la fauna mastologica de las capas con restos de Pyrotherium. Boletin Instituto Geografico Argentino 18:406-521
- S. Roth. 1898. Reconocimiento de la Region Andina de la República Argentina. Apuntes sobre la Geología y la Paleontología de los Territorios del Río Negro y Neuquén (Diciembre de 1895 á Junio de 1896) [Reconnaissance of the Andean Region of the Argentine Republic. Notes on the Geology and Paleontology of the Territories of the Río Negro and Neuquén (December 1895 to June 1896)] 1-56
- F. Ameghino. 1901. Notices préliminaires sur des ongulés nouveaux des terrains crétacés de Patagonie [Preliminary notes on new ungulates from the Cretaceous terrains of Patagonia]. Boletin de la Academia Nacional de Ciencias de Córdoba 16:349-429
- G. G. Simpson. 1945. A Deseado Hegetothere from Patagonia. American Journal of Science 243(10):550-564
- E. Cerdeño and M. Reguero. 2015. The Hegetotheriidae (Mammalia, Notoungulata) assemblage from the late Oligocene of Mendoza, central-western Argentina. Journal of Vertebrate Paleontology 35(2):e907173:1-14
