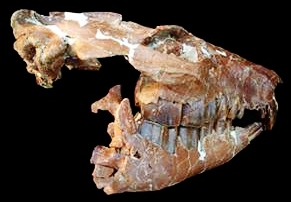
- Skull and mandible of Trachytherus

Scientific classification
- Kingdom: Animalia
- Phylum: Chordata
- Class: Mammalia
- Order: †Notoungulata
- Family: †Mesotheriidae
- Subfamily: †Trachytheriinae
- Genus: †Trachytherus; Ameghino, 1889

Type species
- †Trachytherus spegazzinianus

Species
- T. alloxus (Billet et al, 2008); T. ramirezi (Shockey et al, 2016); T. spegazzinianus (Ameghino, 1889); T. subandinus (Villarroel, 1994)

Synonyms
- Ameghinotherium Podestá, 1899; Anatrachytherus Reguero & Castro, 2004; Eutrachytherus Ameghino, 1897; Isoproedium Ameghino, 1904; Proedium Ameghino, 1895

= Trachytherus =

Trachytherus Temporal range: Late Oligocene-Early Miocene (Deseadan-Colhuehuapian) ~28–17.5 Ma

Extinct genus of notoungulates

Trachytherus is an extinct genus of mesotheriid notoungulate that lived from the Late Oligocene to the Early Miocene in what is now South America.

== Description ==
Trachytherus had a relatively low, compact skull with an elongated snout, longer than in Mesotherium but very similar. The postorbital process was also smaller and the nasal bones did not extend as far as in Mesotherium. The most notable difference between the two genera was in the zygomatic arch; in the anterior region, the insertion surface of the lateral masseter was highly developed, but not as large than in Mesotherium.

The first upper incisor was highly developed, continuously growing (hypsodont) and arched, with an enamel band only on the labial side. The following incisors, canines and premolars were greatly reduced or vestigial. The last three premolars were molar-like, with a very complex pattern rapidly disappearing with wear. The molars were similar to those of Pseudotypotherium and Cochilius, but did not possess the three-lobed internal structure characteristic of Mesotheriinae.

== Classification ==
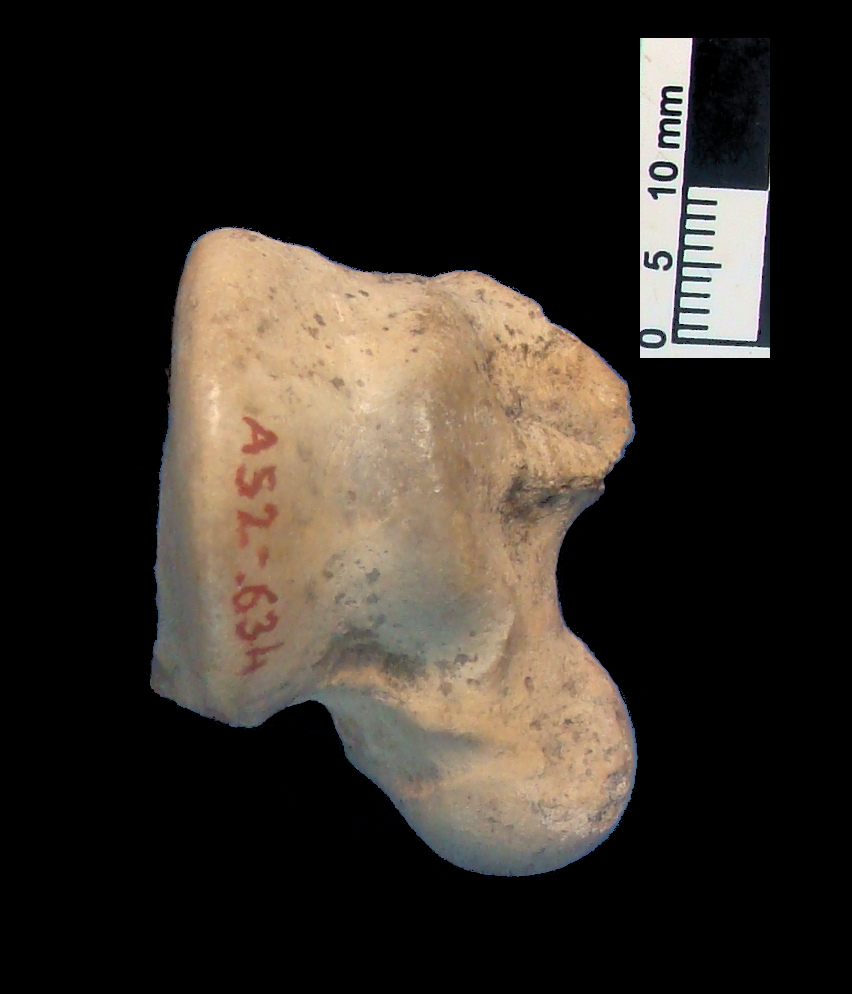
Right astragalus of Trachytherus

The genus Trachytherus was first described in 1889 by Florentino Ameghino, based on fossil remains found in the Sarmiento Formation, a Late Oligocene geological formation in Patagonia. The type species Trachytherus spegazzinianus, was also found in several other Oligocene deposits across South America. It was originally assigned to the family Typotheriidae, but Ameghino moved it in 1892 to its own family, Trachytheriidae. In 1894 Lydekker moved the genus back to Typotheriidae, regarding it as the taxon that evolutionarily connected Nesodon and Typotherium. In 1895, Ameghino refuted these affinities, although considering that Trachytherus and Typotherium were related, although not closely enough to belong to the same family. In 1897, for unknown reasons, Ameghino changed the genus name to Eutrachytherus, with its own family, Eutrachytheridae. Later, working on its astragalus, he admitted that the similarities between the bones of Eutrachytheriidae and Typotheriidae were so important that their differences were insignificant to him. In 1913, William Berryman Scott placed Trachytherus back in the Typotheriidae, and from there there was a consensus from the researchers. Typotheriidae was the name Lydekker assigned to the family containing the genus Typotherium. This genus was later synonymized with Mesotherium, meaning the name "Typotheriidae" lost its validity and is now synonymous with Mesotheriidae.

Several other species have been assigned to Trachytherus, such as T. medocensis, T. ramirezi, T. alloxus, T. subandinus, T. modestus, T. grandis, found in Bolivia, Peru, and Argentina. However, several studies indicates that the genus Trachytherus is paraphyletic and represents a series of derived and basal forms of other typotheres.

- - Archaeohyrax
  - Mesotheriidae
    - Trachytherus ramirezi
    - - Trachytherus alloxus
      - - Trachytherus subandinus
        - Trachytherus spegazzinianus
        - - Plesiotypotherium
          - Mesotherium

== Paleoecology ==
Several species of Trachytherus are known from the mid latitudes of western South America, in an area called the Bolivian Orocline. A paleobiogeographical reconstruction indicate that this region is the possible ancestral area of the Mesotheriidae, and therefore an important region for the diversification of these animals. Later, the mesotheriids, including 'Trachytherus, dispersed to more southern areas. Though at times considered a grazer, Trachytherus had a complex dietary habit that was not exclusively or predominantly based on grasses.
