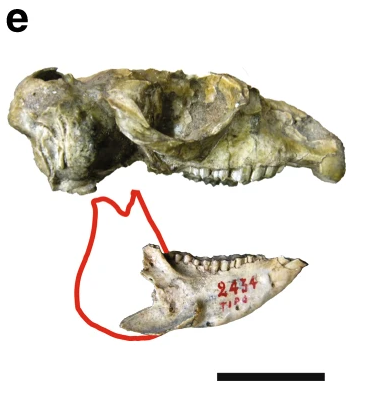
- Skull of Tremacyllus

Scientific classification
- Kingdom: Animalia
- Phylum: Chordata
- Class: Mammalia
- Order: †Notoungulata
- Family: †Hegetotheriidae
- Subfamily: †Pachyrukhinae
- Genus: †Tremacyllus; Ameghino, 1891

Type species
- †Tremacyllus impressus Ameghino, 1891

Species
- T. impressus Ameghino, 1891; T. incipiens Rovereto, 1914

Synonyms
- T. diminutus Ameghino, 1891; T. chapalmalensis Ameghino, 1908; T. novus Ameghino, 1908; T. latifrons Rovereto, 1914; T. intermedius Rovereto, 1914

= Tremacyllus =

Tremacyllus Temporal range: Late Miocene-Late Pleistocene (Chasicoan-Lujanian) ~7–0.012 Ma

Extinct genus of notoungulates

Tremacyllus is an extinct genus of hegetotheriids. It lived from the Late Miocene to the Late Pleistocene (~7-0.012 Ma) and its fossilized remains were discovered in South America.

== Description ==
This animal was approximately the size of a hare, and both animals, while unrelated, must have been quite similar in appearance. Its skull had large orbits and strong lower incisors, similar to modern lagomorphs. It was probably a fast animal, with long legs, although proportionally shorter than other similar animals such as Pachyrukhos or extant lagomorphs. Compared to its relative Paedotherium, Tremacyllus was slightly smaller and possessed several distinctive characteristics in its dentition: its diastema was longer, the third upper molar was shorter or had the same size as the second molar, and the lower premolars were more overlapping and less molar-like. Furthermore, the symphysis of the mandible was shorter than in the Paedotherium.

== Classification ==
The genus Tremacyllus was described in 1891 by Florentino Ameghino for the species Pachyrukhos impressus, described by Ameghino himself a few years earlier. He named the type species Tremacyllus impressus, from the Pliocene and the Early Pleistocene, and several other species were later described by Ameghino himself, such as T. chapalmalensis, T. diminutus and T. novus, and by Gaetano Rovereto, such as T. intermedius and T. incipiens, the latter of which lived during the Late Miocene. A 2017 study led by Renatta Sostillo, Esperanza Cerdeño and Claudia I. Montalvo however determined that the presumed differences between all the species of Tremacyllus could be explained by intraspecific variations, and therefore that the only valid species was the type, T. impressus. However, a 2022 study by Armella, Ercolli, Bonini and Garcia-Lopez found sufficient proof to recognize T. incipiens as a valid species. Tremacyllus was a specialized member of the Hegetotheriidae, a group of small-sized lagomorph-like notoungulates. Particularly, Tremacyllus was close from the genera Pachyrukhos and Paedotherium, and was one of the last hegetotheres known, as well as one of the last notoungulates.

== Paleobiology ==
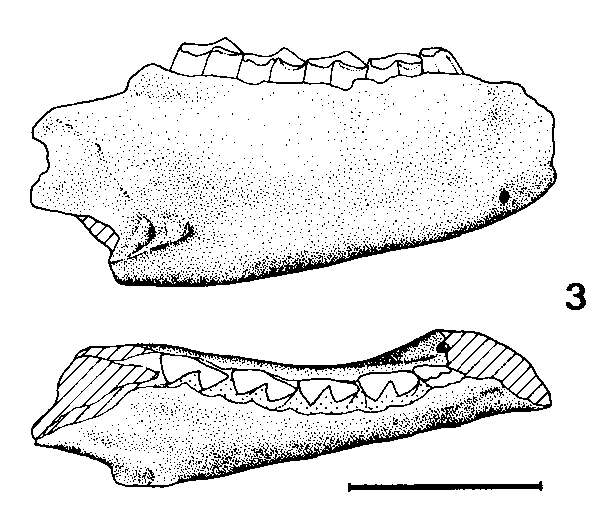
Mandible of Tremacyllus impressus

One of the exceptional characteristics of Tremacyllus, as well as its relatives within Pachyrukhinae, such as Paedotherium, is the presence of a real sciuromorph condition in its chewing apparatus, defined by an anterior portion of the masseter muscle coming from a large zygomatic plate reaching the rostrum; a characteristic traceable within Hegetotheriidae since the Oligocene. Hence, those animals are the first case of a non-rodent mammal developing a sciuromorph condition. This morphology would have permitted them to explore ecological niches unavailable to the histrichomorph rodents that coexisted with them. This innovative acquisition seems to have appeared at the same time in sciuromorph rodents and pachyrukhins, and could be linked with the consumption of hard food. It is therefore supposed that the expansion of nut trees and cone trees caused by major environmental changes during the Eocene-Oligocene transition may have been the potential trigger for this convergent evolution. A recent study on tooth microwear of Tremacyllus suggest it had a primarily fruit and seed-based diet.
