= Altitypotherium =

Altitypotherium Temporal range: Early Miocene ~18–17 Ma

Scientific classification
- Kingdom: Animalia
- Phylum: Chordata
- Class: Mammalia
- Infraclass: Placentalia
- Order: †Notoungulata
- Family: †Mesotheriidae
- Subfamily: †Mesotheriinae
- Genus: †Altitypotherium; Croft, Flynn & Wyss, 2004

Type species
- †Altitypotherium chucalensis Croft, Flynn & Wyss, 2004

Species
- A. chucalensis Croft, Flynn & Wyss, 2004; A. paucidens Croft, Flynn & Wyss, 2004

Extinct genus of mammals

Altitypotherium is an extinct genus of Notoungulate, belonging to the suborder Typotheria. It lived during the Early Miocene, and its fossilized remains were discovered in South America.

== Description ==
This animal was vaguely similar to a wombat, and its dimensions evoke those of a raccoon; its skull was approximately 16 centimeters long, while its total length, excluding the tail, was about 80 centimeters. It weighed around 10 kilograms.

Altitypotherium had a tall and narrow snout, with only six pairs of teeth in the maxilla and mandible, a low number when compared to most other notoungulates. It had gliriform upper incisors, with a band of anterior enamel, and lower incisors protruding forward and separated from premolars and molars by a long diastema. It had high-crowned (hypsodont) teeth, and the occlusal surfaces of the molars had two enamel folds halfway through the tooth in the inner surface and outlining three dentin-filled lobes, forming an E-shaped form. The largest species, Altitypotherium paucidens was distinguished from its closest relatives by the loss of the upper third molar.

== Classification ==
The genus Altitypotherium was first described in 2004, based on fossil remains found in the Chucal Formation in Northern Chile, in Early Miocene terrains; two species are currently known, A. chucalensis and A. paucidens. Fossils attributed, with some uncertainty, to the genus have also been found in Argentina.

Altitypotherium belonged to the family Mesotheriidae, a group of typotheres that diversified during the Cenozoic, giving rise to forms the size of a ram. Altitypotherium belonged to the subfamily Mesotheriinae, the most derived clade of the group.

== Paleobiology ==
Altitypotherium was a terrestrial herbivore with fossorial behaviour. It fed on low vegetation, roots and tubers, which it grinded with its powerful posterior teeths. It lived at fairly high altitudes. It shared several similarities, notably its hypsodont teeth, with modern wombats.

== Bibliography ==
- D. A. Croft, J. J. Flynn, and A. R. Wyss. 2004. Notoungulata and Litopterna of Early Miocene Chucal Fauna, Northern Chile. Fieldiana Geology 50:1-52
- G. M. López, M. G. Vucetich, A. A. Carlini, M. Bond, M. E. Pérez, M. R. Ciancio, D. J. Pérez, M. Arnal, and A. I. Olivares. 2011. New Miocene mammal assemblages from Neogene Manantiales basin, Cordillera Frontal, San Juan, Argentina. In J. A. Salfity, R. A. Marquillas (eds.), Cenozoic Geology of the Central Andes of Argentina 211–226
