= Río Frías Formation =

Geologic formation in western Patagonia

- Stratigraphic range: Middle Miocene (Friasian); ~16.5–15.5 Ma
- Type: Geological formation
- Overlies: Ñirehuao Formation

Lithology
- Primary: Tuff, tuffite, siltstone, unconsolidated sand, conglomerate

Location
- Coordinates: 44.6°S 71.2°W
- Approximate paleocoordinates: 45.2°S 66.3°W
- Region: Aysén Region
- Country: Chile
- Extent: Aysén Basin

Type section
- Named for: Río Frías
- Named by: Santiago Roth
- Year defined: 1898
- Río Frías Formation (Chile)

Río Frías Formation (Spanish: Formación Río Frías) is a Middle Miocene geologic formation made up sedimentary rock located in Aysén Region, western Patagonia. The formation crops out along the upper course of Cisnes River (Spanish: Río Cisnes). Marsupial fossils have been found in the formation. The Friasian period in the South American Land Mammal Ages is named after the formation.

== Description ==
Río Frías Formation was discovered by Santiago Roth in the summer of 1897–98. Roth was a Swiss immigrant who had been sent to survey the area by Francisco Moreno. Moreno was director of La Plata Museum and was involved in the Cordillera of the Andes Boundary Case between Chile and Argentina, thus there was both a political and scientific motivation behind the exploration of Patagonia. Santiago Roth called the upper course of Río Cisnes for Río Frías being unaware that it was the same river. Further he thought this unexplored area to be in Argentina and not in Chile. This led the formation to acquire its name. Roth sent fossils he collected from the formation to Florentino Ameghino who was active at La Plata. It was with this fossils Ameghino established the Friasian period. Later research on ^{40}Ar/^{39}Ar data revealed the base of the formation dating to 16.5 Ma, which means a slight overlap with the Santacrucian land mammal age (ending at 16.3 Ma). The formation was deposited in a fluvial environment, characterized by an intermontane valley flanked by Cretaceous basement rocks.

=== Fossil content ===
The following fossils have been found in the formation:

Group	Fossils	Image	Notes
Mammals	Astrapotherium hesperinum		
Mammals	Prothylacinus patagonicus		
Mammals	Adinotherium sp.		
Mammals	Nesodon sp.		
Mammals	Protypotherium sp.		
Mammals	Borhyaena tuberata		
Mammals	Theosodon sp.		
Mammals	Cladosictis patagonica		
Mammals	Pachyrukhos sp.		
Mammals	Homalodotherium sp.		
Mammals	Abderites meridionalis, Alloiomys friasensis, Megathericulus friasensis, Microbiotherium tehuelchum, Parabderites bicrispatus, Palaeothentes intermedius, P. lemoinei, P. minutus, Pichipilus halleuxi, Pitheculites rothi, Prototrigodon rothi, Sipalocyon gracilis, Neonematherium sp., Phoenixauchenia sp., ?Propalaehoplophorus sp., Prozaedyus sp., Trachytypotherium sp., Platyrrhini indet.		
