= Eotypotherium =

Eotypotherium Temporal range: Early Miocene ~22.5–17 Ma

Scientific classification
- Domain: Eukaryota
- Kingdom: Animalia
- Phylum: Chordata
- Class: Mammalia
- Order: †Notoungulata
- Family: †Mesotheriidae
- Genus: †Eotypotherium; Croft, Flynn & Wyss, 2004
- Species: †E. chico

Binomial name
- †Eotypotherium chico Croft, Flynn & Wyss, 2004

Extinct genus of mammals

Eotypotherium is an extinct genus of mammal, belonging to the suborder Typotheria. It lived during the Early Miocene. Its fossilized remains were discovered in the Chucal Formation, in the Chilean altiplano, near the Salar de Surire, in South America.

== Etymology ==
The name Eotypotherium is composed of the greek prefix "Eo-", meaning "dawn", and of the suffix "-typotherium", an invalid name for the genus Mesotherium, which gave its name to the suborder Typotheria. This name was given due to the relative antiquity of this taxon compared to other Mesotheriidae.

== Description ==
The genus is known from various remains of small-sized skulls, with the notable absence of a well-developed zygomatic plate. The first upper incisor presents a groove in its lingual part.

== Holotype ==
The holotype, SGOPV 5157, held by the Chilean National Museum of Natural History in Santiago de Chile, includes the right half of a face, with the maxilla and the right zygomatic arch.
