= Hegetotherium =

Hegetotherium Temporal range: Early-Middle Miocene (Colhuehuapian-Colloncuran) ~21–15.5 Ma
- Skull of Hegetotherium mirabile

Scientific classification
- Kingdom: Animalia
- Phylum: Chordata
- Class: Mammalia
- Infraclass: Placentalia
- Order: †Notoungulata
- Family: †Hegetotheriidae
- Subfamily: †Hegetotheriinae
- Genus: †Hegetotherium; Ameghino 1887

Species
- H. mirabile Ameghino 1887 (type); H. cerdasensis Croft et al. 2016

Extinct genus of notoungulates

Hegetotherium is a small to middle-sized extinct genus of mammals, ranging from the size of rabbit (about 20-30 cm/12-16") to a beaver (about 3 ft/1 m) from the Early to Middle Miocene (Colhuehuapian-Colloncuran in the SALMA classification), through Pliocene sites of South America. Fossils of this genus have been found in the Cerro Bandera, Cerro Boleadoras, Chichinales, Collón Curá, Santa Cruz and Sarmiento Formations of Argentina, the Nazareno Formation of Bolivia, and the Galera and Río Frías Formations of Chile.

== Taxonomy ==
Hegetotherium is currently restricted to the type species, H. mirable, of which H. convexum, H. anceps, H. minum and H. andinum are synonyms, but also H. cerdasensis. "Hegetotherium" arctum was formerly assigned to this genus, but is clearly not a member of Hegetotheriidae. "Hegetotherium" novum was formerly referred to the closely related genus Prohegetotherium, but is now considered generically distinct from that genus. Historically, it was believed that Hegetotherium persisted to the Pliocene, though the specimens formerly attributed to Hegetotherium from the Pliocene more likely belong to other hegetotheriid genera, such as Hemihegetotherium.

== Description ==
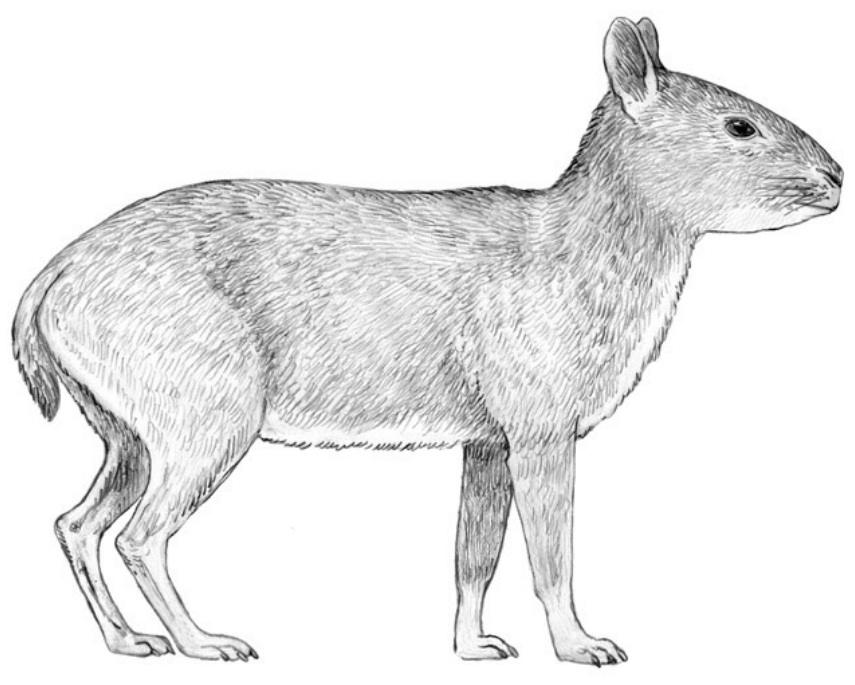
Life restoration of Hegetotherium

In Hegetotherium, as in other hegetotheriids, the internal carotid artery travelled along the basicranial keel in an enclosed osseous canal.

Hegetotheres are characterised by enlarged first upper incisors, implanted obliquely in the premaxilla. Their lower teeth have a straight lingual face. They were among the most recently diverging families of typothere notoungulates, with their early fossil record closely resembling mesotheriids. The hegetotheres, belonging to notoungulate group, have hypselodont (ever-growing) teeth. They reportedly have enlarged first upper incisors that are obliquely implanted in the prexamilla and lower teeth with a straight lingual face.

== Palaeobiology ==
=== Palaeoecology ===
The hypselodont teeth indicate of hegetotheriids has been interpreted to mean that they ate low-growing vegetables in open habitats. However, the cranial anatomy of Hegetotherium is indicative of a "mammalian woodpecker" ecology, suggesting that it used its jaws to break through wood to feed on xylophagous grubs and insects within fallen logs. Unlike other mammalian woodpeckers, such as Daubentonia, Dactylopsila, and Yalkaparidon, Hegetotherium was a diurnal, cursorial animal. According to a principal component analysis of the proximal articular surface of the ulna of H. mirabile, the species was neither specialised for climbing nor for digging.
