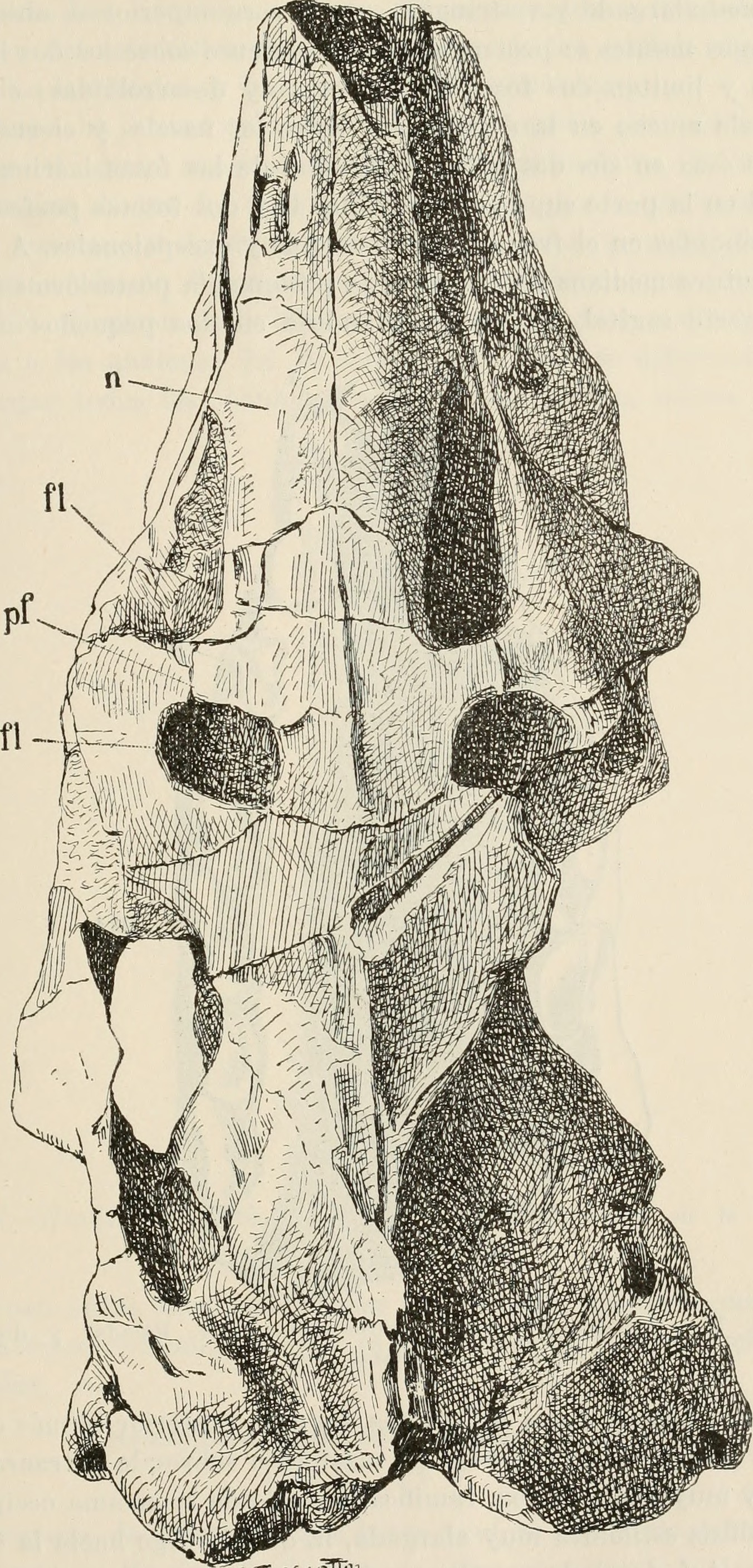
- Skull of Hemihegetotherium achataleptum

Scientific classification
- Kingdom: Animalia
- Phylum: Chordata
- Class: Mammalia
- Order: †Notoungulata
- Family: †Hegetotheriidae
- Subfamily: †Hegetotheriinae
- Genus: †Hemihegetotherium; Rovereto 1914

Type species
- †Hemihegetotherium achataleptum Rovereto, 1914

Species
- H. achataleptum Rovereto 1914; H. tantillum Vera 2019; H. torresi Cabrera & Kraglievich 2019

= Hemihegetotherium =

Hemihegetotherium Temporal range: Middle-Late Miocene ~12–7 Ma

Extinct genus of mammals

Hemihegetotherium is an extinct genus of hegetotheriid notoungulate that lived from the Middle to the Late Miocene of what is now Argentina.

== Description ==
It was a medium-sized animal and had long legs. Although not as those of modern lagomorphs, to which it was, in other regards, superficially similar. Like some of its relatives, the first pair of incisors of Hemihegetotherium was large, and it had simplified but high-crowned (hypsodont) molars and premolars. The structure of those teeth were so simplified in Hemihegetotherium that they consisted of simply a curved cylinder of enamel filled with dentin; compared to Hegetotherium, the molars were more convex, with a semi-elliptical section. However, those teeth had pointed cusps along their outer margin. Hemihegetotherium had a tibia and fibula solidly fused together in their extremities, both distal and proximal.

== Classification ==
The genus Hemihegetotherium was first described in 1914 by Gaetano Rovereto, based on fossil remains discovered in the Las Floras Formation (San Juan Province, Argentina); the type species is Hemihegetotherium achataleptum.

The other species are H. torresi, from the Late Miocene of Argentina, and H. trilobus, from the Middle Miocene of Quebrada Honda in Bolivia, this last species distinguished from the other species of the genus by the presence of a trilobed third lower molar, hence its species name. H. tantillum, described in 2019, shared similarities with H. trilobus, and was found in Patagonia.

Hemihegetotherium was a member of Hegetotheriidae (hence its generic name, meaning "half Hegetotherium"), a group of usually small notoungulates with the superficial appearance of rodents or hares. Hemihegetotherium was similar but less specialized than the eponymous genus Hegetotherium.

== Paleoecology ==
Hemihegetotherium was a terrestrial herbivore, probably consumming low and particularly fibrous plants, both in open and forested areas. The limbs of Hemihegetotherium may have been suitable both for running and digging.

== Bibliography ==
- Croft DA, Anaya F (2006) A new middle Miocene hegetotheriid (Notoungulata: Typotheria) and a phylogeny of the Hegetotheriidae. Journal of Vertebrate Paleontology 26:387–399.
- F. D. Seoane, S. R. Juñent, and E. Cerdeño. 2017. Phylogeny and paleobiogeography of Hegetotheriidae (Mammalia, Notoungulata). Journal of Vertebrate Paleontology 37(1):e1278547:1-13
