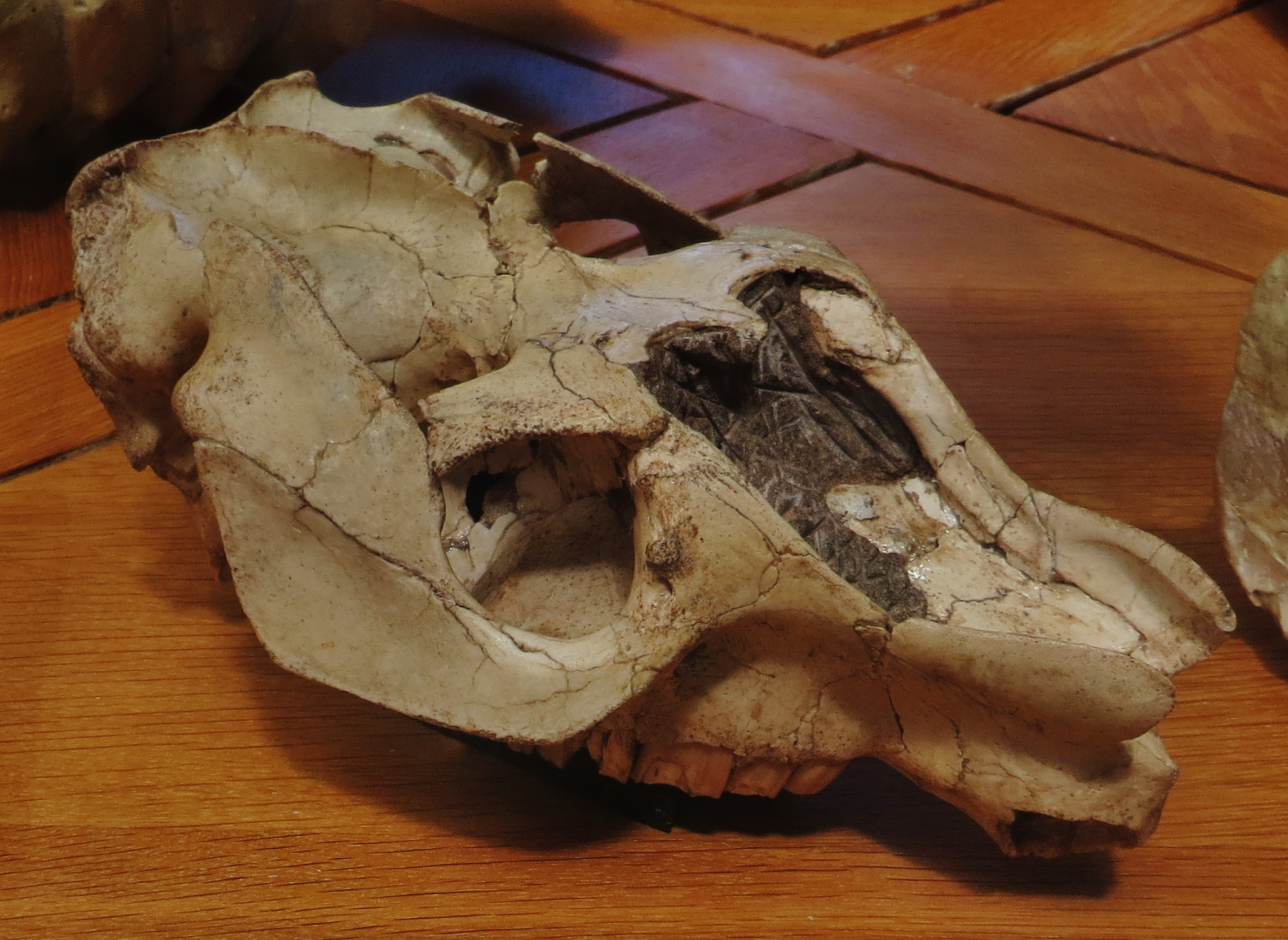
- Skull of Plesiotypotherium

Scientific classification
- Kingdom: Animalia
- Phylum: Chordata
- Class: Mammalia
- Order: †Notoungulata
- Family: †Mesotheriidae
- Subfamily: †Mesotheriinae
- Genus: †Plesiotypotherium; Villarroel, 1974

Type species
- †Plesiotypotherium achirense Villarroel, 1974

Species
- P. achirense (Villarroel, 1974; P. casirense (Cerdeño et al, 2012); P. majus (Villarroel, 1974); P. minus (Croft, 2007)

= Plesiotypotherium =

Plesiotypotherium Temporal range: Middle-Late Miocene ~13–6 Ma.

Extinct genus of notoungulates

Plesiotypotherium is an extinct genus of notoungulate, belonging to the suborder Typotheria. It lived from the Middle to the Late Miocene, and its fossilised remains were discovered in South America.

== Description ==
This animal was somewhat similar to modern wombats, but was slightly larger-sized. Plesiotypotherium, like its relatives Trachytherus and Mesotherium, was characterized by a postcranial skeleton suited for burrowing. Its scapula was characterized by a distally located suprascapular fossa; the deltoid crest was well developed. The humerus of Plesiotypotherium was slightly thinner than in Trachytherus, and had a characteristic perforation in the olecranon fossa. The entepicondyle, ectepicondyle and supracondylar crest were well developed. The ulna was characterized by a well developed olecranon, while in the proximal area of the radius a sesamoid bone was articulated with the main bone; the distal part of the radius had particular grooves for the tendons of the extensor muscle. The hand was strong; the carpal bones, the metacarpals and the phalanges were particularly strong. The pelvic area of Plesiotypotherium was characterized by its five vertebrae firmly fused with each other. The transverse processes of the penultimate vertebra were fused solidly with the ischium. The talus had a characteristic asymmetrical trochlear keel; the lateral keel was much wider than the middle one and evocative of those of ground sloths.

The skull was characterized by its large anterior incisors, separated from the posterior teeth by a large diastema; in the species Plesiotypotherium casirense, there was a bony process in the lacrimal bone, and a large infraorbital foramen.

== Classification ==
Plesiotypotherium is a derived member of the family Mesotheriidae, a family of notoungulates whose representatives, while superficially similar to rodents, could reach relatively large sizes.

Plesiotypotherium was first described in 1974 by Villarroel, based on well-preserved fossils found near the location Achiri, in Bolivia, dated from the Middle to Late Miocene. The type species is Plesiotypotherium achirense, and Villarroel described also P. majus, from the same locality and horizon. More recent findings from the locality Chasira, also in Bolivia, were attributed to the new species P. casirense.

== Palaeobiology ==
Studies carried out on the postcranial skeleton of Plesiotypotherium have permitted to determine that it was adapted for burrowing into the ground, perhaps to unearth its alimentation, potentially composed of roots and tubers.

A skeleton belonging to Plesiotypotherium achirense showed numerous palaeopathologies preserved in its bones and dentition. The skeleton shows the bilateral absence of permanent hypselodont molars, as well than the exostosis of several leg bones. The first pathology can be linked with the loss of the two first molars on both sides of the jaws, potentially due to long-lasting periodontal diseases; other pathologies, notably in the skull, and possibly linked with the previous pathology, led to the overgrowth of the two first upper molars on both sides of the skull, and to the abnormal development of the masticatory muscles insertion. Other pathologies can be found in the postcranial skeleton, such as several bone growths in several areas over the articular surfaces of the leg bones, from the scapula to the distal phalanges. These pathologies may have limited the individual movements and its locomotion. Given its numerous pathologies, one could assume that this individual may have been an easy prey; however, its long term survival suggests a low predatory pressure, a hypothesis congruent with the virtual absence of carnivorous vertebrates in the fossil record of the Achiri area, where its fossils were discovered. It is likely that Plesiotypotherium achirense lived in groups, like numerous extant herbivorous ungulates.
