= Auguste Bravard =

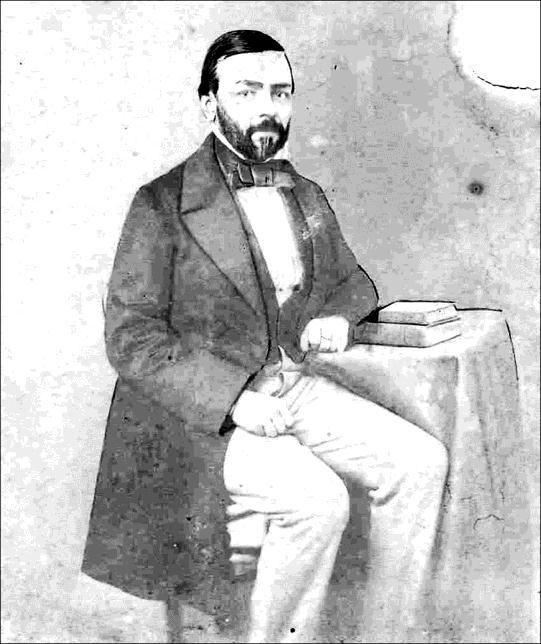
- portrait of Auguste Bravard
- Born: 18 June 1803; Issoire, Puy-de-Dôme
- Died: 28 March 1861 (aged 57); Mendoza, Argentina
- Scientific career
- Fields: Paleontology

Notes
- (Note: Bravard died during an earthquake at Mendoza, according to Juan José Parodiz.)

(Pierre Joseph) Auguste Bravard (18 June 1803 – 28 March 1861) was a French mining engineer turned palaeontologist. He hunted fossils in the Vaucluse, Allier and his native Puy de Dôme.

== Biography ==
Bravard emigrated to Argentina in the winter of 1852–53 and was a long-term resident in Buenos Aires. He unearthed and studied mammalian fossils, some of which, like the skull of Mesotherium, were sent back to the Muséum d'histoire naturelle, Paris. Pleistocene mammal fossils purchased from Bravard are also in the Museum of Natural History, South Kensington, London, transferred from the British Museum, which had purchased them from Bravard in 1854. Bravard, who became director of the natural history museum in Paraná, upheld geological theories contrary to those of Charles Darwin. (Note: "Bravard's discoveries seem to me magnificent, & especially interesting is the fact of Palæotherium Paranense, taken with (I think) the Nebraska Palæotherium. Bravard has sent me two Spanish pamphlets (which I find to my surprise I can hardly translate) in which he has strange geological doctrine, of whole enormous Pampean deposit being a subaerial deposit. He disputes the coembedment of the Bahía Blanca fossils with recent shells; but I am by no means convinced. It seems to me impossible that a whole skeleton, (even to knee-cap) could be washed out of one formation & embedded in another & that other formation a turbulent one with largish pebbles & cross layers.)

From Buenos Aires, he explored in Bahía Blanca, resulting in his Mapa geológico y topográfico de los alrededores de Bahía Blanca, Buenos Aires (1857). He also explored the Paraná basin and the pampas.

Periodically Bravard lithographed his letters and distributed them to geologists in Europe.

After his unexpected death in the Mendoza earthquake of 1861, his remarkable collection of fossils disappeared. At the turn of the twentieth century, an auction of unclaimed crates by the Buenos Aires customs office revealed the collection, which was handed over to the Museo Nacional de Ciencias Naturales, Buenos Aires.

At Issoire, he is commemorated in the rue August Bravard.

== Works ==
- Catalogue des especes d'animaux fossiles recuilies dans I'Amerique du Sud (1852-1856)
- Observaciones geológicas sobre diferentes terrenos de transporte de la hoya del Plata (1857)
- Estado físico del territorio. Geología de las Pampas (1858)
- Carta geológica de la Provincia de Entre Ríos (1858)
- Monografía de los terrenos marinos terciarios de las cercanías del Paraná (1858)
