= Hypsitherium =

Hypsitherium Temporal range: Pliocene (Chapadmalalan) ~4.0–3.0 Ma

Scientific classification
- Kingdom: Animalia
- Phylum: Chordata
- Class: Mammalia
- Infraclass: Placentalia
- Order: †Notoungulata
- Family: †Mesotheriidae
- Genus: †Hypsitherium; Anaya & MacFadden 1995
- Species: †H. bolivianum

Binomial name
- †Hypsitherium bolivianum Anaya & MacFadden 1995

Extinct genus of mammals

Hypsitherium is an extinct genus of Mesotheriidae that lived 4.0 to 3 million years ago. It is known from the Miocene to Pliocene Inchasi fossil locality in Bolivia. Hypsitherium was a scansorial herbivore, and its name translates to "high beast."
