= Fiandraia =

Fiandraia Temporal range: Oligocene-Miocene (Deseadan-Colhuehuapian) ~29–21 Ma

Scientific classification
- Kingdom: Animalia
- Phylum: Chordata
- Class: Mammalia
- Order: †Notoungulata
- Genus: †Fiandraia; Roselli, 1976

Type species
- †Fiandraia romeii Roselli, 1976

Extinct genus of notoungulates

Fiandraia is an extinct monotypic genus of notoungulate that lived in Uruguay during the Oligocene and the Early Miocene. It was found in the Fray Bentos Formation, in rocks dated back from the Deseadan period.

The taxonomic status of Fiandraia has been historically disputed; in 1976, its discoverer, Roselli, assigned it in the family Mesotheriidae; in 1978, in Mones & Ubilla, it was considered part of Interatheriidae; McKenna & Bell, in 1997, placed it inside its own family, Fiandraiinae, itself part of Mesotheriidae; Flynn et al considered it, in 2005, as a member of the Toxodontidae instead of the Mesotheriinae.
