= Medistylus =

Medistylus Temporal range: Late Oligocene (Deseadan) ~29–21 Ma

Scientific classification
- Domain: Eukaryota
- Kingdom: Animalia
- Phylum: Chordata
- Class: Mammalia
- Order: †Notoungulata
- Family: †Hegetotheriidae
- Subfamily: †Pachyrukhinae
- Genus: †Medistylus; Ameghino 1903

Type species
- †Medistylus dorsatus Ameghino, 1903

Extinct genus of notoungulates

Medistylus is an extinct genus of pachyrukhine hegetotheriid. It lived in Argentina during the Late Oligocene. Medistylus is known from its upper teeth and isolated skulls, however, its lower dentition is currently unknown. Its fossilized remains were found at the Cabeza Blanca and Las Cascadas localities of the Sarmiento Formation in Chubut Province of Argentina.

== Description ==
Medistylus was one of the largest members of the subfamily Pachyrukhinae and had continuously growing teeth, like Propachyrucos. It had a huge pair of front incisors, set obliquely. It lacked the teeth between the first incisor and the second molar, and instead had a toothless space, known as a diastema. It fed on low-lying grass, which caused it to incorporate abrasive particles into its common diet. It had a large fossa at the insertion of the superficial and deep masseter muscles.
