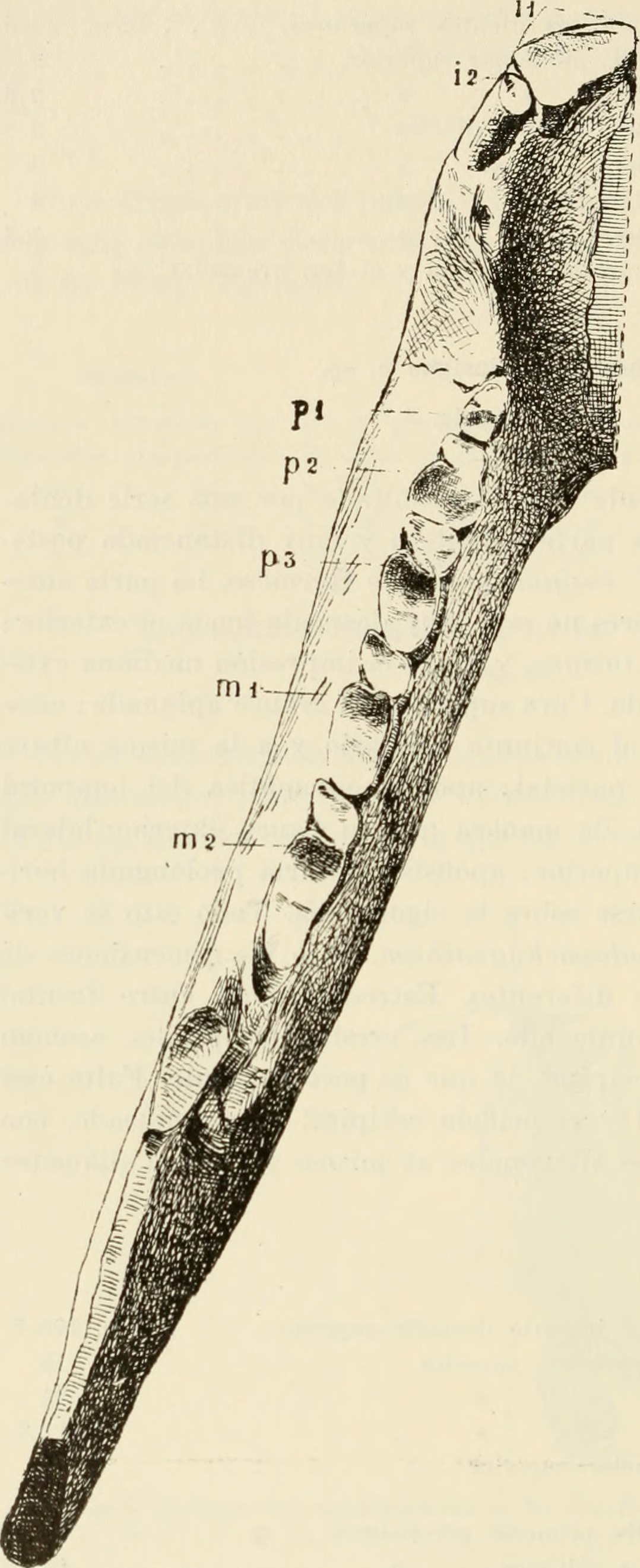
- Left mandible of Pseudotypotherium

Scientific classification
- Kingdom: Animalia
- Phylum: Chordata
- Class: Mammalia
- Order: †Notoungulata
- Family: †Mesotheriidae
- Subfamily: †Mesotheriinae
- Genus: †Pseudotypotherium; Ameghino 1904

Type species
- †Pseudotypotherium pulchrum Ameghino, 1904

Species
- P. carhuense Cabrera 1937; P. pulchrum Ameghino 1904; P. studeri Moreno & Mercerat 1891; P. subinsigne Rovereto 1914

= Pseudotypotherium =

Pseudotypotherium Temporal range: Late Miocene-Late Pliocene ~7–3 Ma

Extinct genus of notoungulates

Pseudotypotherium is an extinct genus of notoungulates, belonging to the suborder Typotheria. It lived from the Late Miocene to the Late Pliocene, and its fossilized remains were discovered in South America.

== Description ==
This animal, like all the typotheres, was superficially similar to a rodent. It was close to the size of a sheep, and Pseudotypotherium is considered as one of the largest known typotheres. It is known from several skeletons and skulls, and it is therefore possible to reconstruct faithfully its appearance.

== Classification ==
The genus Pseudotypotherium was first described in 1904 by Florentino Ameghino, based on fossil remains found in Argentina in Late Pliocene terrains. Among the best known species is the type species P. pulchrum, from the Late Pliocene, and the older species P. subinsigne and P. carhuense from the Late Miocene. Fossils attributed to the genus have also been found in Bolivia.

Pseudotypotherium was a typical member of Typotheria, a clade of notoungulates which, during their evolution, independently developed several anatomical characteristics similar to those of rodents, probably occupying numerous ecological niches only occupied by rodents on the other continents. Pseudotypotherium was a member of the family Mesotheriidae, which included some of the most specialized typotheres.

== Bibliography ==
- F. Ameghino. 1904. Nuevas especies de mamíferos, cretáceos y terciarios de la República Argentina [New species of mammals, Cretaceous and Tertiarty, from the Argentine Republic]. Anales de la Sociedad Cientifica Argentina 56–58:1-142
- B. Patterson. 1934. The auditory region of an upper Pliocene typotherid. Field Museum of Natural History, Geological Series 6: 83–89.
- A. Mones. 1980. Sobre una colección de vertebrados fósiles de Monte Hermoso (Plioceno Superior), Argentina, con la descripción de una nueva especie de Marmosa (Marsupialia: Didelphidae). Comunicaciones Paleontologicas del Museo de Historia Natural de Montevideo 1(8):159-169
- L. G. Marshall and T. Sempere. 1991. The Eocene to Pleistocene vertebrates of Bolivia and their stratigraphic context: a review. Fósiles y Facies de Bolivia - Vol. 1 Vertebrados (Revista Ténica de YPFB) 12(3-4):631-652
- Billet, G., De Muizon, C. and Mamani Quispe, B. (2008), Late Oligocene mesotheriids (Mammalia, Notoungulata) from Salla and Lacayani (Bolivia): implications for basal mesotheriid phylogeny and distribution. Zoological Journal of the Linnean Society, 152: 153-200. doi:10.1111/j.1096-3642.2007.00388.x
- D. H. Verzi and C. I. Montalvo. 2008. The oldest South American Cricetidae (Rodentia) and Mustelidae (Carnivora): Late Miocene faunal turnover in Central Argentina and the Great American Biotic Interchange. Palaeogeography, Palaeoclimatology, Palaeoecology 267(3-4):284-291
