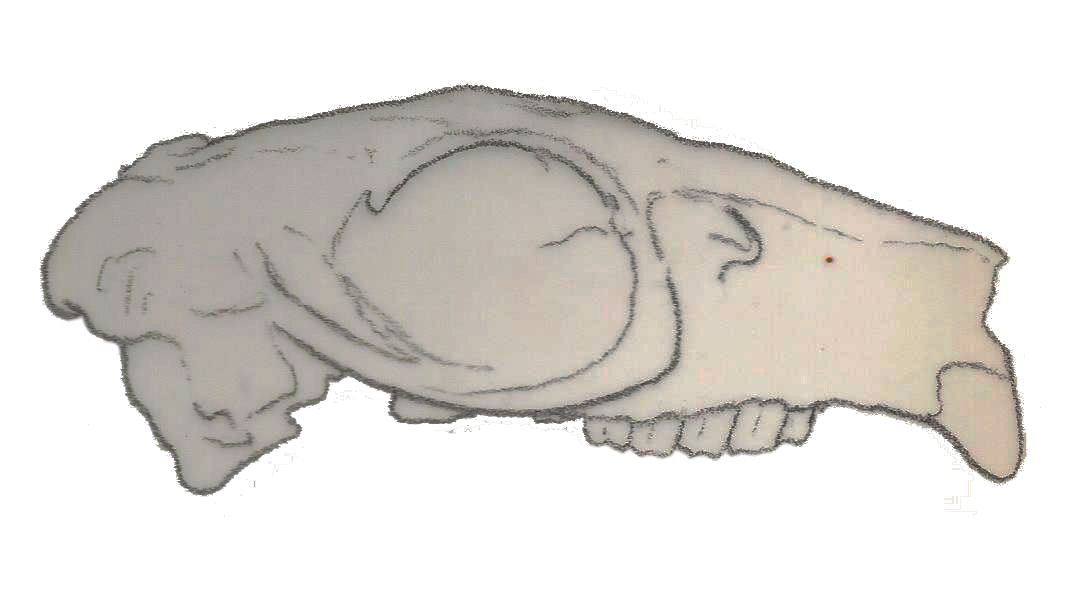
- Skull of Paedotherium

Scientific classification
- Kingdom: Animalia
- Phylum: Chordata
- Class: Mammalia
- Order: †Notoungulata
- Family: †Hegetotheriidae
- Subfamily: †Pachyrukhinae
- Genus: †Paedotherium; Burmeister, 1888

Type species
- †Paedotherium bonaerense Ameghino, 1887

Species
- P. bonaerense Ameghino, 1887; P. borrelloi? Zetti, 1972; P. dolichognathum? Zetti, 1972; P. kakai Reguero et al, 2015; P. minor Cabrera, 1937; P. typicum Ameghino, 1887

Synonyms
- Genus synonymy: Raulringueletia Zetti, 1972; Species synonymy: Pachyrucos typicus Ameghino, 1887; Pachyrucos bonaeriensis Ameghino, 1887; Paedotherium insigne Burmeister, 1888; Pachyrucos ictus Ameghino, 1889; Pachyrucos maximus Ameghino, 1908; Pachyrucos miramarensis Ameghino, 1908; Pachyrucos chapalmalensis Ameghino, 1908; Paedotherium imperforatum Kraglievich, 1926; Paedotherium maximum Castellanos, 1956; Paedotherium ictum Castellanos, 1956; Pachyrucos brusquitaensis Ameghino, 1908; Pachyrucos marplatensis Ameghino, 1908; Paedotherium marplatense Kraglievich, 1952; Paedotherium brusquitaense Rusconi, 1947; Paedotherium affine Cabrera, 1937; Paedotherium borrelloi? Zetti, 1972

= Paedotherium =

Paedotherium Temporal range: Late Miocene-Late Pliocene (Chasicoan-Uquian) ~10–1.5 Ma

Extinct genus of notoungulates

Paedotherium is an extinct, potentially paraphyletic genus of Notoungulate, belonging to the family Hegetotheriidae, composed of small-sized, rodent or lagomorph-like South American ungulates. Four species are unambiguously recognised, from the Late Miocene to the Pleistocene of Argentina, and from the Late Miocene of Bolivia and Chile.

== History ==
The first remains associated today with Paedotherium were first described in 1887 by Florentino Ameghino, and attributed to the related genus Pachyruckhos due to an important number of similarities. He name the remains Pachyrukhos bonaerense. Its holotype is MACN 1184, remains of the palatal area including the incisors, molars, and premolars, to which he include another specimen, MACN 1667, both assumed to come from the Ensenada Formation. In 1888 Hermann Burmeister describe the new genus Paedotherium insigne. It is, however, rapidly considered a synonym of Pachyrukhos, which take precedence and to which most Paedotherium remains were attributed until 1926. In 1908, Ameghino mentions three new species, Pachyrukhos chapadmalensis, P. brusquitaensis, and P. marplatensis. In 1914, P. brusquitaensis is considered by Rovereto as a synonym of P. chapalmalensis. In 1926, Lucas Kraglievich revalidated the genus Paedotherium over remains from the Early Pliocene Monte Hermoso Formation of Argentina. He also associates other remains from the Chapadmalal Formation to the genus, including a humerus and a tibiofabula (MACN 6125), for which he create the species Paediotherium imperforatum. In 1937, Cabrera described the two new species P. minor and P. affine, from remains from Late Miocene rocks of the Arroyo Chasicó Formation. P. minor holotype (MLP 29-IX-I-116) included palatal remains with an upper incisor and a set of cheek teeth. In 1956, Castellanos described two new species of Paedotherium, P. isolinense and P. brocherense, from fragmentary mandibular remains. In 1972 Zetti described Raulringueletia from fragmentary cranial remains (MLP 62-IV-6-1) from the Huayquerian of the Carro Quemado Formation, as well as the new species P. borrelloi, which he thought was intermediate between P. minor (to which he associated P. affine) and P. typicum.

In 1998 Cerdeño and Bond reevaluate Paedotherium and merge Raulringueletia dolicognathus on the basis of the presence of diagnostic features of Paedotherium on its holotype. They, however, maintain it as a species, creating Paedotherium dolicognathum, but considering it a potential specimen of Paedotherium minor. Their study consider P. bonaerense, P. insigne, P. ictus, P. maximus and P. miramarensis as synonyms, P. bonaerense taking priority. P. chapadmalense, P. brusquitaense and P. marplatense were also revised as synonym of P. typicum, as well as P. borrelloi as synonymous with P. minor. The study also estimated the holotypes of P. isolinense and P. brocherense as non-diagnostic, making the two species nomem dubium. Finally, in 2015, an article authored by Reguero et al created a new species, P. kakai, with S.Sal.Scar.Paleo.2012-045 as holotype, a mandibular fragment with cheek teeths. It was named kakai after the Cacán language spoken by the native Diaguitas and Calchaquies in the Salta Province, were the holotype of the new species was found. In 2017 a new analysis by Ercoli et al of the teeth remains resurrected P. borrelloi as a valid species.

== Description ==
The fossils of Paedotherium are very similar to its relative, Pachyrukhos. It was a small-sized mammal and had an hypsodont, "rabbit-like" dentition. Its body shared several similarities with modern rodents and lagomorphs, such as long, hare-like legs, sharp and prominent incisors and even brains similar to those of Caviidae . Its weight is roughly estimated between 1.8 and 2.2 kg. It is generally assumed to be a grazer and maybe a burrower.

Its cranium was different from other hegetotheres by a more developed antorbital maxillary process and a lack of sagittal crest. The third upper molar longer than the second, the second upper and lower premolars are longer and narrower than Pachyrukhos, the third lower molar has a triangular-shaped lobe. Its limbs had longer metatarsals, a more robust second metatarsal and shorter fourth and fifth metatarsal bones than Pachyrukhos.

== Species ==
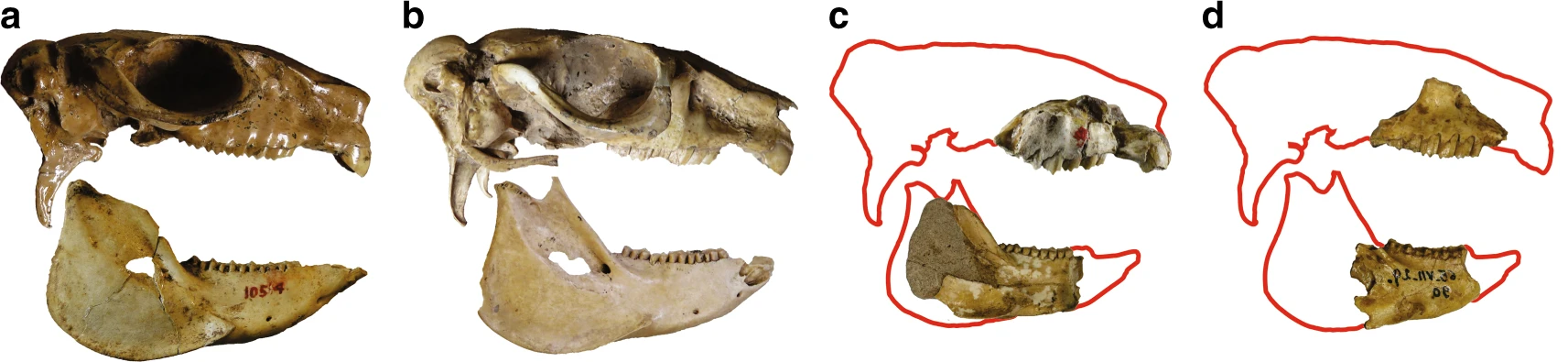
Skull of several species of Paedotherium. From left to right : P. bonaerense, P. typicum, P. minor, P. borrelloi.

Only four species of Paedotherium are currently considered valid; two other species, P. borrelloi and P. dolichognathum, are disputed and generally considered synonym of P. minor:

=== Paedotherium bonaerense ===
P. bonaerense is the type species of the genus. It is known from the Montehermosan Monte Hermoso Formation, the Chapadmalalan Chapadmalal Formation and the Uquian Barranca de los Lobos Formation, Vorohué Formation and Necochea fossil beds, the later remains being the more recent remains known of any Hegetotheriidae. It had wider greater zygomatics, a wider and shorter occipital, and a stronger mandibular symphysis than the other species of the genus; its fourth upper premolar was more molariform than P.typicum, and its upper premolars were devoid of posterolingual groove. During the Chapadmalalan period, P. bonaerense was the most common species of Paedotherium. While only known from fragmentary remains from the Buenos Aires Province, the species may have survived until the Ensenadan period.

=== Paedotherium typicum ===
P. typicum is known from Pliocene rocks of the Monte Hermoso Formation and the Chapadmalal Formation. It coexisted with the same-sized P bonaerense during this period, and may have survived in the early Uquian. It had narrower zygomatics, a narrower and higher occipital face, a shorter mandibular symphysis and premolars less molariform than P. bonaerense, and a non-reduced lacrimal. It was the most common species of Paedotherium during the Montehermosan period.

=== Paedotherium minor ===
P. minor is the earliest member of the genus known, living during the Late Miocene. Its fossils were recovered in rocks of the Arroyo Chasicó Formation and the Epecuen Formation of Argentina, the Cura Mallin Formation of Chile and in the Guandacay Formation of Bolivia.

=== Paedotherium? borrelloi ===
P. borrelloi was originally described in 1972 by Zetti, but was considered by Cerdeño and Bond as synonymous with P. minor. It was established as a new species in 2017. Its diagnostic features included a small size and teeth intermediate between P. minor, P. typicum and P. bonaerense. It is known only from the Huayquerian Cerro Azul Formation.

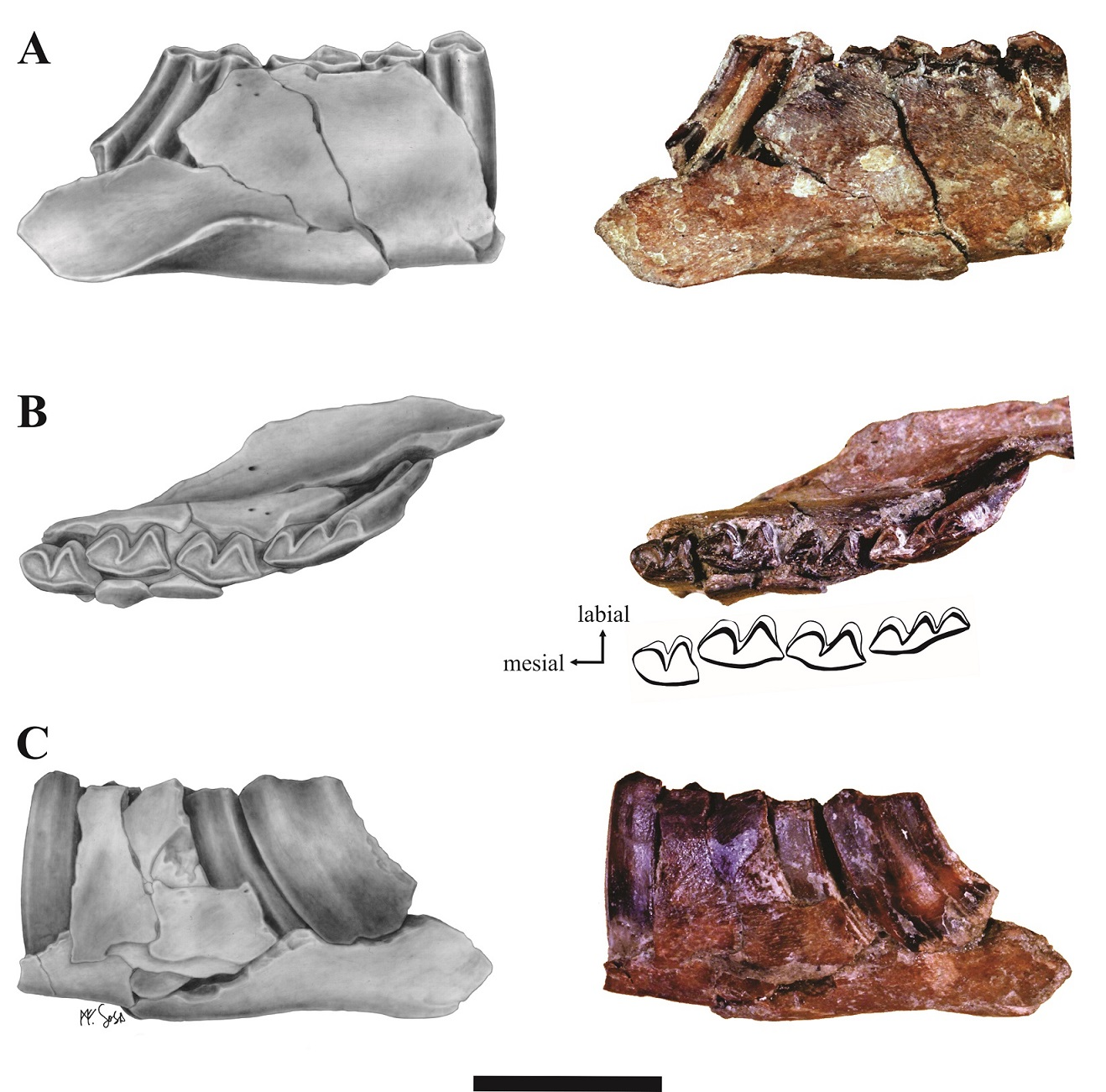
Holotype of Paedotherium kakai

=== Paedotherium dolichognathum ? ===
Originally named Raulringueletia dolichognathus, this species is only known from its holotype, cranial remains with broken teeth from Huayquerian rocks of the Carro Quemado Formation. The only diagnostic difference of those remains with existing species of Paedotherium is a greater length of the pterygopalatine fossae, and most authors consider it as synonymous with P. minor.

=== Paedotherium kakai ===
P. kakai is known from the Palo Pintado Formation of Argentina, in rocks dated to the Huayquerian period. The trigonid of its teeth were more rounded than in other species, its molariforms lacked cementum, and were less hypsodonts than in P. ttypicum and P. bonaerense. Unlike the other species in the genus, it lived in covered, forested environments.

== Palaeobiology ==
=== Palaeoecology ===
Paedotherium was well adapted for mortar-and-pestle-like crushing as well as grinding. This finding is consistent with pachyrukhine dental microwear showing them to be hard object feeders. Another study performing dental microwear texture analysis (DMTA) on Paedotherium found them to be fruit-seed consumers, though with one individual having been concluded to have engaged in grazing instead.

=== Growth and development ===
The mandibular ontogeny of the genus remained consistent throughout the Late Cenozoic. The growth rate of the pachyrukhine's mandible decreased over the course of its ontogenetic development.

== Paleoenvironment ==
The genus was present in a number of environment, from arid environments in the open pampa near the Plataense sea known in formations such as the Arroyo Chasicó where P. minor was present to the more wet and forested fluvial environments documented in the Palo Pintado Formation where P. kakai is the only known form.

Paedotherium was one of the last surviving notoungulate, and the most recent hegetothere known, along with Tremacyllus. The genus survived the Great American Interchange, and may have survived until the earliest Pleistocene. The extinction of the small size notoungulate occurred during a period of climate change, to which rodents and lagomorphs may have been better adapted.
