= Phoenixauchenia =

Phoenixauchenia Temporal range: Miocene (Friasian) ~16.3–15.5 Ma

Scientific classification
- Kingdom: Animalia
- Phylum: Chordata
- Class: Mammalia
- Order: †Litopterna
- Family: †Macraucheniidae
- Genus: †Phoenixauchenia; Ameghino 1904
- Species: †P. tehuelcha

Binomial name
- †Phoenixauchenia tehuelcha Ameghino 1904

Extinct genus of mammals

Phoenixauchenia is an extinct genus of mammal belonging to the family Macraucheniidae and the order Litopterna. It lived in Chile during the Miocene.
