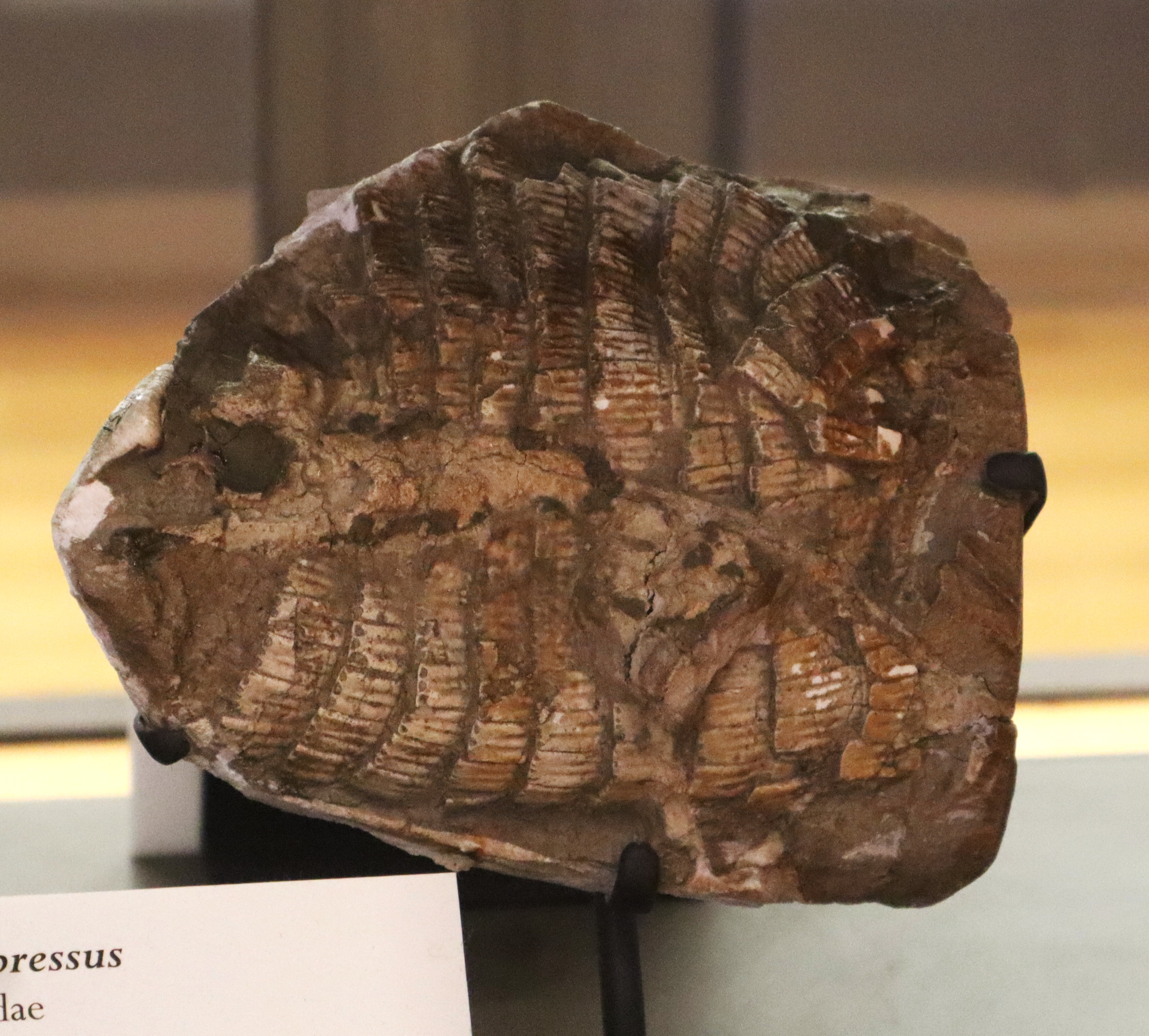
- Carapace of P. impressus, Beneski Museum of Natural History

Scientific classification
- Kingdom: Animalia
- Phylum: Chordata
- Class: Mammalia
- Order: Cingulata
- Family: Chlamyphoridae
- Subfamily: Euphractinae
- Genus: †Prozaedyus; Ameghino, 1891

Type species
- Prozaedyus exilis Ameghino 1887

Species
- P. exilis Ameghino 1887; P. humilis Ameghino 1902; P. impressus Ameghino 1897; P. minimus Desmarest 1860; P. planus Ameghino 1897; P. proximus Ameghino 1887; P. scillatoyanei Barasoain et al 2020; P. tenuissimus Ameghino 1902

= Prozaedyus =

Prozaedyus Temporal range: Middle Oligocene-Middle Miocene (Deseadan-Friasian) ~33–16.5 Ma

Extinct genus of mammals

Prozaedyus is an extinct genus of chlamyphorid armadillo that lived during the Middle Oligocene and Middle Miocene in what is now South America.

== Description ==
It was a small-sized animal, and its life appearance was probably similar to that of the extant pichi, and its length didn't exceeded more than 40 centimeters. It differed from the pichi by a well-developed scapular armor, the enlargement of its tympanic bulla and the ossification of its external auditory canal. Like several modern armadillos, Prozaedyus was characterized by its carapace formed by straight and narrow osteoderms, with small hair foramina. Foramina were often present along the sides of the osteoderms, as well as along its back. Prozaedyus had no teeth in its premaxilla, while its maxilla had 7–8 teeth, and the mandible had 10.

== Classification ==
The first fossils of this animal were discovered in Early Miocene terrains in Argentina, and were described in 1887 by Florentino Ameghino under the species Dasypus exilis. Ameghino later erected the genus Prozaedyus for these remains, finding several affinities with the modern genus Zaedyus. In addition to Prozaedyus exilis, the type species, several other species were later attributed to the genus by Ameghino, such as the larger Prozaedyus impressum, P. humilis, P. planus and P. tennuissimus. All these species are mainly distinguished by its osteoderm details. Fossils attributed to Prozaedyus have also been found in Bolivia and Chile.

Prozaedyus is one of the oldest members of the family Chlamyphoridae, which comprise most of the extant genera of armadillos. Ameghino considered this genus as an ancestor of the extant Zaedyus.
