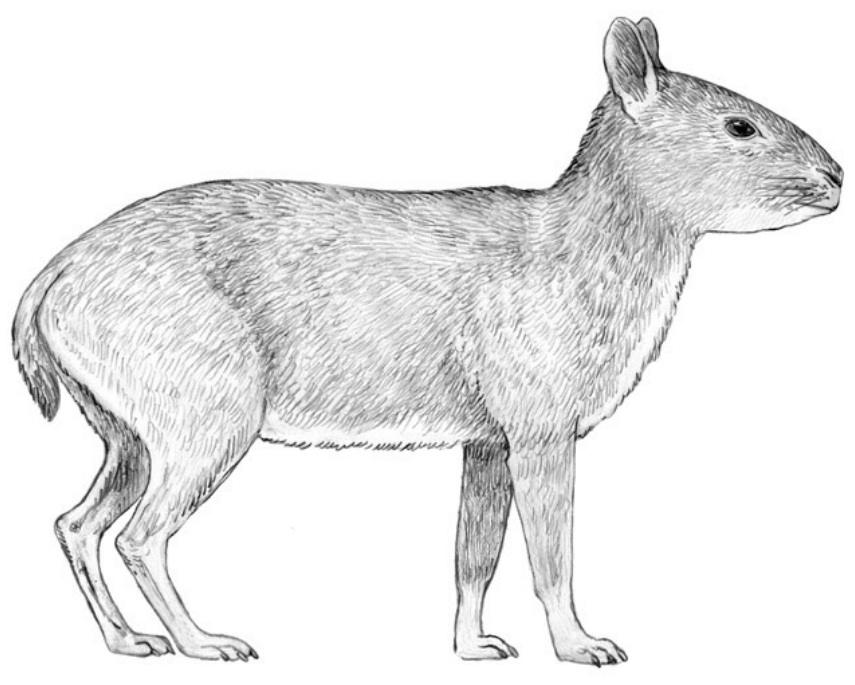
- Life restoration of Hegetotherium

Scientific classification
- Kingdom: Animalia
- Phylum: Chordata
- Class: Mammalia
- Order: †Notoungulata
- Suborder: †Typotheria
- Family: †Hegetotheriidae; Ameghino, 1894

Subfamilies and genera
- †Hegetotheriinae: †Ethegotherium; †Hegetotherium; †Hemihegetotherium; †Prohegetotherium; †Pseudohegetotherium; †Pachyrukhinae: †Medistylus; †Propachyrucos; †Prosotherium; Pachyrukhini; †Pachyrukhos; †Paedotherium; †Tremacyllus

= Hegetotheriidae =

Hegetotheriidae Temporal range: Late Oligocene–Early Pleistocene
- Prosotherium garzoni

Extinct family of mammals

Hegetotheriidae is an extinct family of notoungulate mammals known from the Oligocene through the Pliocene of South America. The family underwent many sequential radiation events throughout the Cenozoic, which led to Hegetotheriids being among the most diverse of the Typotheria.

== Description ==
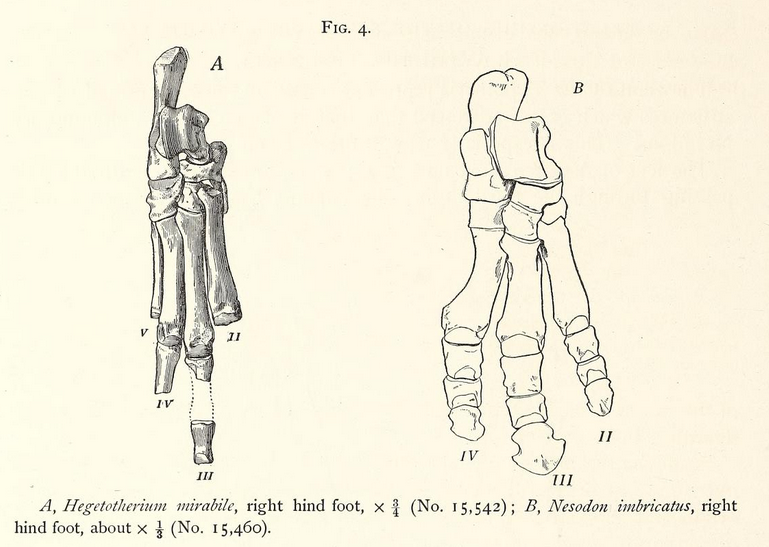
Foot structure of Hegetotherium

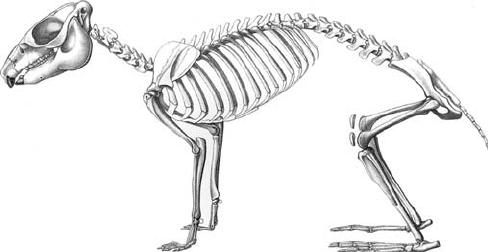
Skeleton of Pachyrukhos

Hegetotheriids are anatomically convergent with caviomorph rodents, possessing hypertrophied (enlarged) incisors. The incisors of Hegetotheriids are also hypsodont, scalpriform and procumbent, indicating a diet of abrasive plants. This is due to the fact that Hegetotheriids, living in the southernmost portions of South America, had a diet consisting of both Neotropical and Andean flora.

== Classification ==
Hegetotheriidae is placed in Typotheria, a clade of rodent-like notoungulates. Historically, there has been debate as to whether Hegetotheriidae should be split from the other Typotheres, though this view is not upheld.
