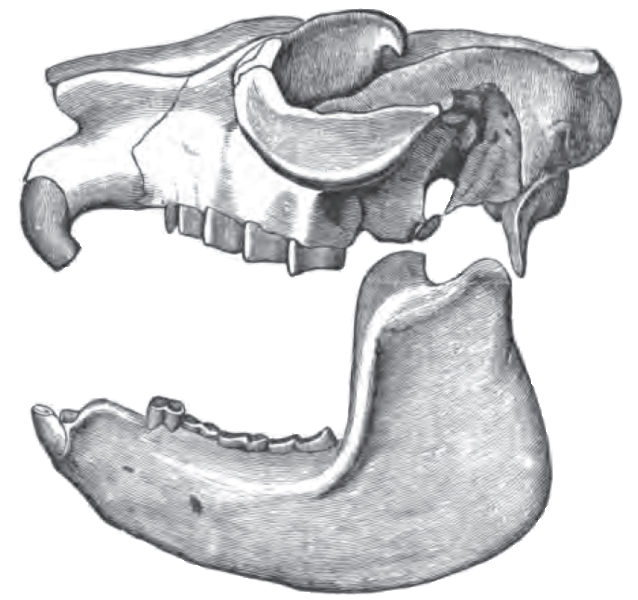
- Mesotherium cristatum

Scientific classification
- Kingdom: Animalia
- Phylum: Chordata
- Class: Mammalia
- Order: †Notoungulata
- Suborder: †Typotheria
- Family: †Mesotheriidae; Alston, 1876

Subfamilies and genera
- †Fiandraiinae: †Fiandraia; †Mesotheriinae: †Altitypotherium; †Caraguatypotherium; †Eotypotherium; †Eutypotherium; †Hypsitherium; †Ichhutherium; †Mesotherium; †Microtypotherium; †Plesiotypotherium; †Pseudotypotherium; †Typotheriopsis; †Trachytheriinae: †Trachytherus

= Mesotheriidae =

Mesotheriidae Temporal range: Late Oligocene–Middle Pleistocene

Extinct family of mammals

Mesotheriidae ("Middle Beasts") is an extinct family of notoungulate mammals known from the Oligocene through the Pleistocene of South America. Mesotheriids were small to medium-sized herbivorous mammals adapted for digging.

== Characteristics ==
Mesotheriids were small to medium-sized notoungulates; larger forms were approximately the size of a sheep. Additionally, the family is characterized by specializations of the teeth and skeleton. In the dentition, all mesotheriids have ever-growing incisors with enamel restricted to the anterior surface, a condition termed gliriform, as it also occurs in Glires (rodents and lagomorphs). The cheek teeth (premolars and molars) of mesotheriids are high-crowned (hypsodont) and in advanced members of the family, the cheek teeth are also ever-growing. Mesotheriid skeletons are heavily built and show features associated with digging in living mammals. In particular, fossorial characteristics of mesotheriids include deeply fissured claws, presence of a sesamoid bone in the elbow and reinforcement of the pelvic girdle by addition of vertebrae to the sacrum and fusion of the sacrum and innominate.

== Behavior ==
A biomechanical study of the skeleton of three mesotheriid genera (Trachytherus, Plesiotypotherium, and Mesotherium) spanning the temporal range of the family indicates that most or all mesotheriids were adapted for digging. Mesotheriids likely dug for roots and tubers and were most similar in their diet and behavior to living wombats, although no living group is perfectly analogous. Extensive burrowing was considered possible but unlikely given the relatively large size of most mesotheriids.

== Geographic and temporal distribution ==
As with almost all other notoungulates, mesotheriids are known only from the Cenozoic of South America. Unlike some other families, mesotheriid fossils are not found across the continent. Instead, mesotheriids are most abundant and diverse in faunas from middle latitudes in Bolivia and Chile, particularly the Altiplano. Mesotheriid fossils are rare in high latitude Patagonian faunas and absent entirely from tropical faunas in northern South America.

The earliest secure records of the family come from the late Oligocene, when the family is represented by the genus Trachytherus from Argentina and Bolivia. The family reached its greatest diversity in the Miocene, and mesotheriids persisted into the middle Pleistocene, in the form of the type genus, Mesotherium. Mesotheriidae was one of only three notoungulate families to persist into the Quaternary, the others being Hegetotheriidae and Toxodontidae.

== Classification ==
Within the order Notoungulata, Mesotheriidae is placed in the suborder Typotheria. In fact, Typotheria is named for the genus Typotherium, a synonym of Mesotherium. In addition to Mesotheriidae, Typotheria traditionally includes other small bodied notoungulates in the families Oldfieldthomasiidae, Interatheriidae, and Archaeopithecidae. Recent opinion, however, favors inclusion of two additional families in Typotheria, Archaeohyracidae and Hegetotheriidae. These families have traditionally been placed in a separate suborder, Hegetotheria, but phylogenetic studies indicate that their exclusion would render Typotheria paraphyletic. Within Typotheria, mesotheriids are more closely related to archaeohyracids and hegetotheriids than to the remaining typotherian families. In fact, both Mesotheriidae and Hegetotheriidae may have originated from within Archaeohyracidae.

McKenna and Bell recognized three subfamilies within Mesotheriidae: Fiandraiinae, Mesotheriinae, and Trachytheriinae. However, Flynn et al. suggested that Fiandraia, the only known fiandraiine, is not a mesotheriid and may represent a toxodontid instead. Of the remaining subfamilies, Trachytheriinae includes only Trachytherus and may be paraphyletic with respect to Mesotheriinae, which includes more derived genera from the Miocene and later.

Classification of Mesotheriidae:

Family †Mesotheriidae

- Subfamily †Fiandraiinae
  - †Fiandraia (Miocene)
    - †F. romeroi
- Subfamily †Trachytheriinae
  - †Trachytherus (?l. Eocene-l. Oligocene)
    - †T. alloxus
    - †T. spegazzinianus
    - †T. subandinus
  - †Trachytherus (?l. Eocene-l. Oligocene)
- Subfamily †Mesotheriinae
  - †Eotypotherium (e. Miocene)
    - †E. chico
  - †Altitypotherium (e. Miocene)
    - †A. chucalensis
    - †A. paucidens
  - †Microtypotherium (m./l. Miocene)
    - †M. choquecotense
  - †Eutypotherium (m. Miocene)
    - †E. lehmannnitschei
    - †E. superans
  - †Caraguatypotherium (m.-l. Miocene)
    - †C. munozi
  - †Plesiotypotherium (l. Miocene)
    - †P. achirense
  - †Rusconitherium (e. Miocene)
    - †R. mendocensis
  - †Typotheriopsis (l. Miocene)
    - †T. chasicoensis
    - †T. silveyrai
  - †Pseudotypotherium (l. Miocene-?m. Pleistocene)
    - †P. exiguum
    - †P. subinsigne
  - †Mesotherium (e.-m. Pleistocene)
    - †M. cristatum
    - †M. hystatum
    - †M. maendrum
    - †M. pachygnathum
  - †Hypsitherium (e. Pliocene)
    - †H. bolivianum
