= Gaetano Rovereto =

Gaetano Rovereto (15 November 1870 – 23 November 1952) was an Italian geologist and paleontologist who, though critical of applying theories to geology, favoured cyclical processes to explain geological formations. He published on geomorphology, apart from describing and cataloguing fossil molluscs. He worked in Argentina from 1909 to 1921, exploring the region and serving as a consultant for irrigation and public works.

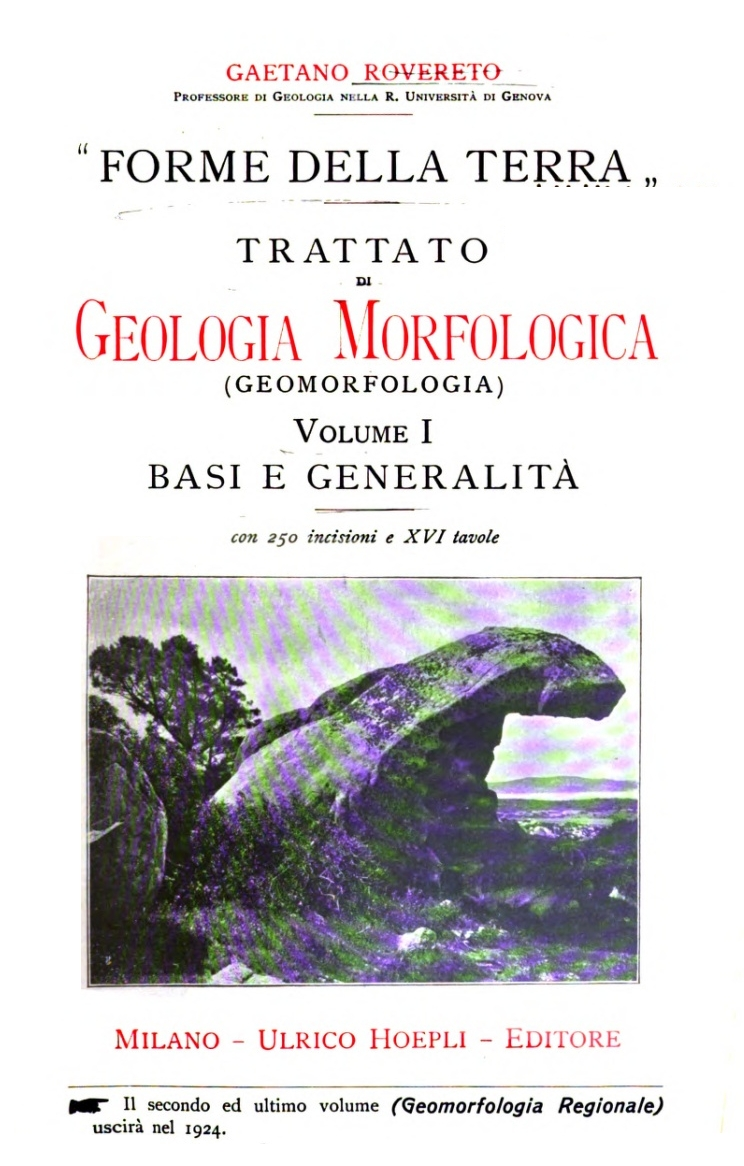
Title page of Geologia Morfologica (1923)

Rovereto was born in Mele, Genoa, the eldest son of Teresa Piccardo and Giuseppe Francesco (1845-1897), belonging to the noble family of the Marquises of Rivanazzano and associated with the paper manufacturing industry. Rovereto became interested in natural history early in his education and was influenced by his teacher, Luigi Sbuttoni. He became a founding member of the Italian Geological Society in 1881 and joined the Ligurian Society of Natural and Geographic Sciences, founded in 1889. He became an assistant at the museum in Genoa in 1891, where he organized the collections. He published an illustrated paper on the fossil molluscs in the collection. He founded the Giornale di Geologia pratica [Journal of Practical Geology] in 1903, along with Paolo Vinassa de Regny, and edited it until 1908. In 1909, he moved to work in Argentina, advising the government on matters of irrigation and the alignment of railway lines. In 1923-24, he published a two-volume treatise on geological landforms, Forme della terra, trattato di geologia morfologica. He became a professor of geology at the University of Genoa and published Liguria Geologica in 1939.

Rovereto married Adele Mameli (d. 1900) in 1899 and had one daughter.
