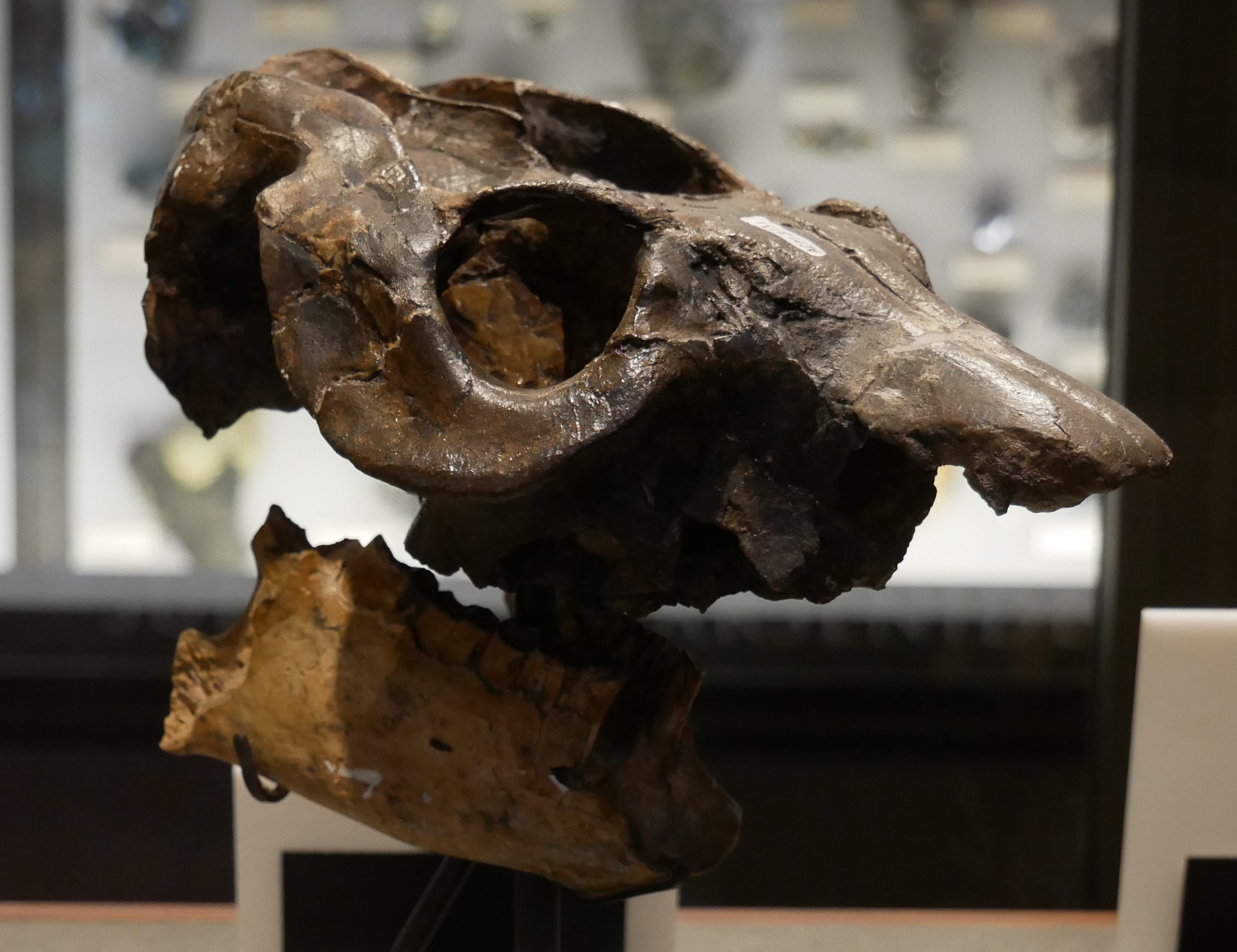
- Skull of Mesotherium cristatum

Scientific classification
- Kingdom: Animalia
- Phylum: Chordata
- Class: Mammalia
- Order: †Notoungulata
- Family: †Mesotheriidae
- Subfamily: †Mesotheriinae
- Genus: †Mesotherium; Serres, 1867

Type species
- †Mesotherium cristatum Serres, 1857

Synonyms
- Genus synonymy: Typotherium Bravard, 1857; Synonyms of M. cristatum: M. medium Bravard, 1857; M. minutum Bravard, 1857; M. protum Bravard, 1857; M. maendrum Ameghino, 1887; M. pachygnathum Gervais & Ameghino, 1883; M. hystatum Ameghino, 1904

= Mesotherium =

Mesotherium Temporal range: Early Pleistocene–Middle Pleistocene

Extinct genus of notoungulates

Mesotherium ("middle beast") is an extinct genus of mesotheriid, a long-lasting family of superficially rodent-like, burrowing notoungulates from South America. It is one of the youngest notoungulates, spanning the Early-Middle Pleistocene, and is the last known member of Typotheria. It was first named by Étienne Serres in 1857, though initially lacked a type species. Another genus name Typotherium, was put forward by Auguste Bravard, and three species were included: however, the name Typotherium was not applied to any particular specimens, and is thus invalid. A type species for Mesotherium, M. cristatum, was named in 1867, securing its status as a valid genus. M. cristatum spanned the Early-Middle Pleistocene.

In many regards, Mesotherium is convergent with rodents, to the point where Serres suggested that it was either a missing link between them and "pachyderms" or close to the ancestry of all mammals. Though fairly small compared to some notoungulates, it was the largest typothere, possibly weighing up to 100 kg (220 lb). The teeth of Mesotherium grew continuously, and its cheek teeth were high-crowned, indicating a diet heavy in abrasive materials. It was probably a grazer for the most part, though, judging by the fact it shared some attributes with burrowing animals, it may also have dug for food underground.

== Taxonomy ==
=== Early history ===
The name Mesotherium first appeared in an 1857 paper by French biologist and physician Étienne Serres. He did not provide a species name, and Mesotherium was initially a nomen nudum. Serres believed, based on its rodent-like incisors, ungulate-like body and the presence of a clavical (which most ungulates lack), that it represented an intermediate stage between Rodentia and "Pachydermata", an artificial assemblage of large mammals that was originally placed in Ungulata. It is for this reason that he named Mesotherium what he did: the name derives from the Greek mesos ("middle") and thēria ("beast"), and thus can be translated to "middle beast". According to a letter written by Scottish evolutionary biologist Hugh Falconer to English naturalist Charles Darwin, Serres believed that Mesotherium may have instead represented "a common centre towards which all mammalia got happily confounded". In 1867, as part of a series of monographs, Serres named Mesotherium cristatum, designating it the type species and fully validating the genus.

=== Validity ===
Although Serres had named Mesotherium in 1857, it was known from the late 19th century to the early 20th century under a different name, "Typotherium", assigned to it in the same year by palaeontologist Auguste Bravard. Bravard assigned three species, T. medium, T. minutum and T. protum, to "Typotherium", though neglected to assign the names to any particular specimens, despite being in possession of a skull, which he apparently believed to represent "the central type from which all mammals diverged". In 1867, French palaeontologist Paul Gervais combined Bravard's genus name with Serres' species name, creating the taxon Typotherium cristatum and apparently discarding the species named by Bravard entirely. In 1940, George Gaylord Simpson wrote a paper on the validity of both names, and which should take priority. In that paper, he noted that there was no indication in Bravard's paper as to what taxon the name Typotherium was to be attributed to. This rendered the name a nomen nudum. As the name Mesotherium predated it by two years, and has a type species with a valid diagnosis, it takes priority and is thus the proper name to use. Simpson indicated that Typotheria and the vernacular "typothere" were still valid, and were in fact more useful, as they could no longer be confused with a given genus. All of the species named by Bravard are invalid, and Mesotherium is thus represented by only one species: the type species, M. cristatum.

== Description ==
Mesotherium was the largest typothere, likely weighing around 75 kg (165 lb), or possibly up to 100 kg (220 lb). It appears to have undergone a size decrease over the course of its existence, with specimens from Middle Pleistocene having a smaller body size than those from the Early Pleistocene.

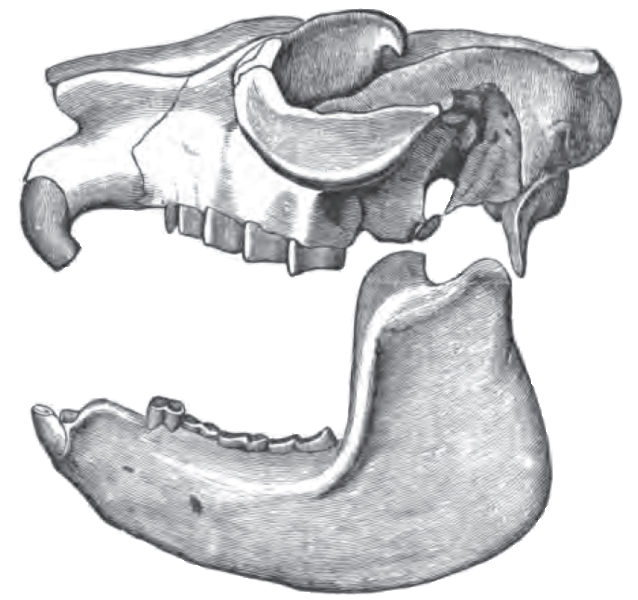
Restoration of the skull and jaws in lateral view

=== Skull and dentition ===
The skull of Mesotherium was in some ways quite rodent-like. The skull, minus the mandible (lower jaw), was low, with a broad, flat cranial portion. The muzzle, meanwhile, was fairly slender, a common trait of selective feeders, contributing to its rodent-like appearance. The orbits (eye sockets) were almost, though not entirely, closed at the back, by postorbital bars erupting from the frontal bones. The mandible was very deep yet rather thin, adding to the skull's overall appearance of great depth. The region around the ear closely resembled that of toxodonts. Unlike other typothere genera, Mesotherium lacked a suborbital fossa and had a small infraorbital foramen.

Mesotherium had a reduced tooth count, with a dental formula of 1.0.2.32.0.1.3 × 2 = 24. The first incisor of the upper jaw, the only one present, was longer than in other typotheres. It grew continuously, as in rodents. Unlike in rodents, it was not worn to a sharp edge, but had an abrupt, squared-off tip. That of the mandible was similar, though was smaller. The cheek teeth were hypsodont (high-crowned). There were only two premolars on the upper jaw and two on the lower jaw. The molars were hypselodont (continuously growing), like in rodents. In many ways they resemble those of Toxodon, though comparisons have been drawn to marsupials like wombats. Like all mesotheriids, the lower cheek teeth of Mesotherium had a well-defined enamel labial infold defining a bilobed pattern, although the enamel layers were more diagonal and parallel in Mesotherium relative to other mesotheriids.

=== Postcranial skeleton ===
The postcranial elements of Mesotherium, so far as they are known, are typical of mesotheriids. Like other members of the group, additional vertebrae were incorporated into the sacrum, and the ischium was fused with the vertebral column. Like other mesotheriid typotheres, Mesotherium had cleft, nail-like ungual phalanges on its forelimbs, while those of the hind limbs were more hoof-like. There were five digits on the front foot, and four on the hind foot. The ankle joint of Mesotherium was made up of a "ball-and-socket" arrangement between the astragalus and the navicular, as well as a sliding articulation of the calcaneocuboid joint, which would enable extension-flexion in the ankle, as well as supination-pronation of the foot. Accordingly, Mesotherium would have possessed a distinct great toe.

== Palaeobiology ==
=== Fossorial habits ===
Certain features of Mesotherium's anatomy, such as the increased vertebral count of its sacrum, the fusion of the ischium with the vertebral column, and the morphology of the ungual phalanges, indicate that it may have been fossorial. Bruce J. Shockey, Darin A. Croft and Federico Anaya, in 2007, proposed that it, and most other mesotheriids, were scratch-diggers, using their chisel-like teeth to cut roots and loosen the substrate ahead of them, thereby supplementing the actions of their forelimbs.

=== Diet ===
Hypsodont teeth, like those possessed by Mesotherium, are often indicative of grazing habits, since grass is abrasive, and high crowns ensure that teeth can endure repeated exposure for longer. However, unlike grazers (which often have broad muzzles), Mesotherium had a fairly narrow one. Shockey, Croft and Anaya noted that this indicates a more selective diet, and lends some credence to the notion that mesotheriids were fossorial: high tooth crowns would protect against abrasive grit as much as they would grasses. However, Marcos D. Ercoli et al. suggested that Mesotherium's mouth was broad enough to function well while grazing, and that their cheek tooth morphology is very similar to that of rhinocerotids. They did not, however, discard the hypothesis that Mesotherium could have fed on buried plant material, noting that both possibilities could have been true at the same time, and would have allowed it to exploit additional food sources when necessary.

== Chronology ==
The oldest known specimens of the genus date to the Early Pleistocene. The youngest known specimen of the genus dates to around 220,000 years ago during the late Middle Pleistocene.
