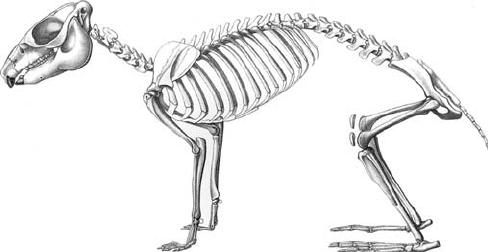
- Skeleton reconstruction

Scientific classification
- Kingdom: Animalia
- Phylum: Chordata
- Class: Mammalia
- Order: †Notoungulata
- Family: †Hegetotheriidae
- Subfamily: †Pachyrukhinae
- Genus: †Pachyrukhos; Ameghino 1885

Species
- P. absis Ameghino 1889; P. elongatus Moreno 1888; P. moyani Ameghino 1885; P. naevius Ameghino 1889; P. politus Ameghino 1902; P. teres Ameghino 1889; P. trivius Ameghino 1889

Synonyms
- Pachyrucos; Pedotherium Burmeister 1888

= Pachyrukhos =

Pachyrukhos Temporal range: Early-Mid Miocene (Colhuehuapian-Friasian) ~21.0–15.5 Ma

Extinct genus of notoungulates

Pachyrukhos is an extinct genus of hegetotheriid notoungulate from the Early to Middle Miocene (Colhuehuapian-Friasian in the SALMA classification) of Argentina and Chile. Fossils of this genus have been found in the Collón Curá, Sarmiento and Santa Cruz Formations of Argentina and the Río Frías Formation of Chile.

== Description ==
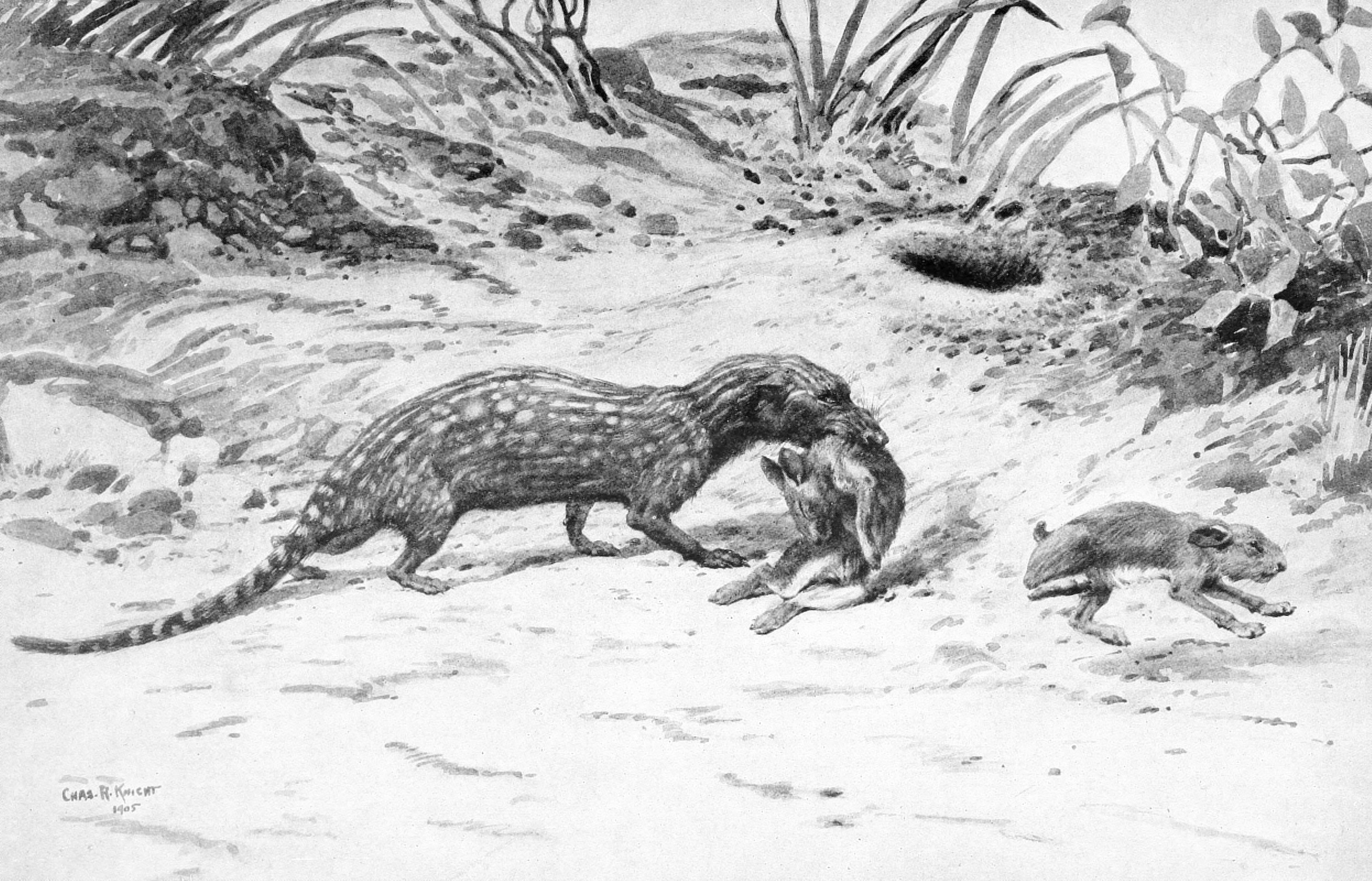
Life restoration of Cladosictis lustratus attacking Pachyrukhos moyani

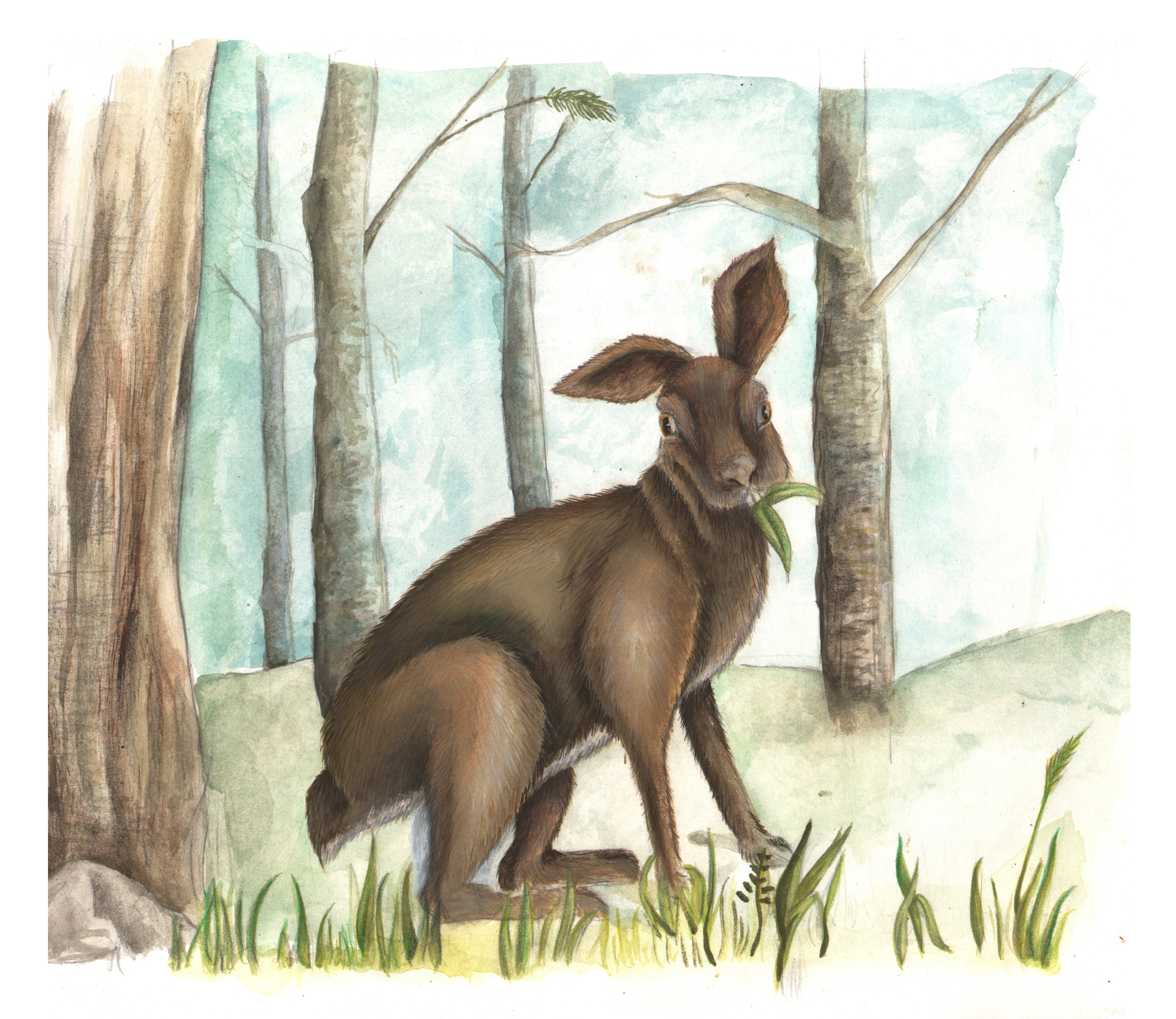
Life restoraiton of Pachyrukhos moyani

Pachyrukhos was about 30 centimetres (0.98 ft) long and closely resembled a rabbit, with a short tail and long hind feet. Pachyrukhos was probably also able to hop, and it had a rabbit-like skull with teeth adapted for eating nuts and tough plants. The complexity of its hearing apparatus in the skull suggests that its hearing would have been very good (among the best of all the notoungulates), and that it probably had large ears. It also had large eyes, suggesting that it may have been nocturnal. These similarities are the result of convergent evolution, since, while quite unrelated to modern rabbits, Pachyrukhos filled the same ecological niche. The dental formula of Pachyrukhos is 1,0,3,32,0,3,3 × 2 = 30. The grinding teeth were hypsodont, and were similar in form to those of Nesodon. The temporalis muscle was poorly developed in Pachyrukhos because it had a large orbit and a small posterior temporal fossa. A reduced mandibular coronoid process and muscle scars on the ascending process of the mandibular angle indicate that the area for the insertion of the temporalis was small. The feet bore 4 digits, with the posterior pair being elongate when compared to the anterior pair. Whilst the bones of the forearm were separate, those in the hindlimbs were coössified.
