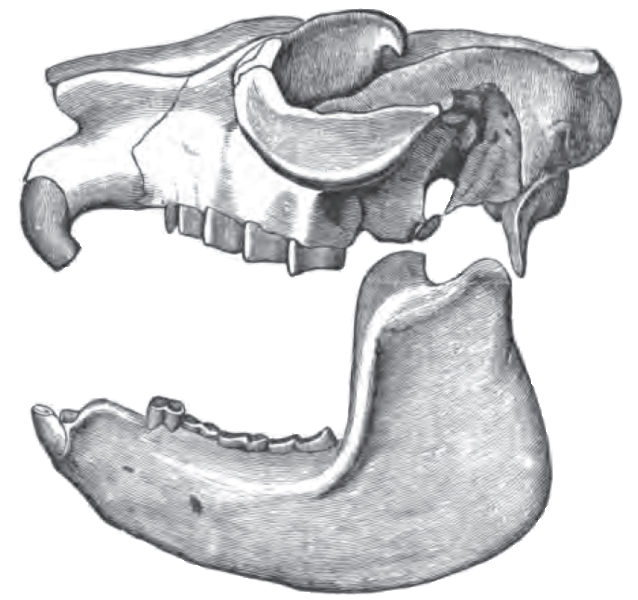
- Mesotherium

Scientific classification
- Kingdom: Animalia
- Phylum: Chordata
- Class: Mammalia
- Order: †Notoungulata
- Suborder: †Typotheria; Zittel, 1892

Families
- Archaeohyracidae; Archaeopithecidae; Campanorcidae; Hegetotheriidae; Interatheriidae; Mesotheriidae; Notopithecidae; Oldfieldthomasiidae

= Typotheria =

Typotheria Temporal range: Late Paleocene–Pleistocene

Extinct suborder of mammals

Typotheria is a suborder of the extinct South American native ungulate order Notoungulata. A majority of the members of this clade were superficially similar to lagomorphs and rodents, though this is due to convergence. The clade was named after Typotherium, a synonym of Mesotherium.

== Anatomy ==
Typotheres all possess a clavicle, unlike other notoungulates in Toxodontia. They have narrow phalanges (the bones of the digits) and claw-like nails. Most typotheres had additional auditory chambers, much like the toxodonts. The cheek teeth and incisors tend to be hypsodont, meaning that they bore high crowns, which is indicative that many typotheres ate a diet of tough plants. The dental canal leads to a branch which comes from the mandibular ramus, posteriorly (towards the rear) and on the outer side.

== Diversity ==
Typotheres were at their most diverse in the early Oligocene, with many of the families of the group having large radiations. Hegetotheriids in particular were incredibly well represented in many formations, with multiple different sequential dispersion events occurring. Mesotheriids, and in particular Mesotherium, persisted into the Pleistocene.

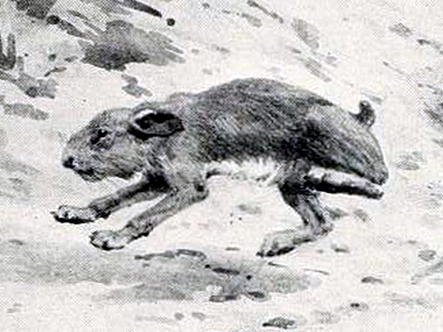
Depiction by Charles R. Knight of Pachyrukhos, a hegetotheriid typothere

== Classification ==
There has been debate over where Typotheria places amongst notoungulates. Some literature places them within Toxodontia, but more recent literature places them as sister clades. The placement of Hegetotheriidae in Typotheria has been contested in the past, with the original description proposing they converged on a similar skull structure to the other typotheres, and that Typotheria and Hegetotheriidae were sister clades. This is not supported, however, by modern phylogenies.
