= Patagorhacos =

Patagorhacos Temporal range: Miocene (Colhuehuapian) 23–17.5 Ma
- Skeletal reconstruction, with preserved elements in grey.

Scientific classification
- Kingdom: Animalia
- Phylum: Chordata
- Class: Aves
- Order: Cariamiformes
- Family: †Phorusrhacidae
- Genus: †Patagorhacos; Agnolin & Chafrat, 2015
- Species: †P. terrificus

Binomial name
- †Patagorhacos terrificus Agnolin & Chafrat, 2015

Extinct genus of birds

Patagorhacos is an extinct genus of phorusrhacid ("terror bird") that lived during the early Miocene epoch (corresponding to the Colhuehuapian South American Land Mammal Age) of the Neogene period in what is now Río Negro Province, Argentina. The first specimen, an isolated quadrate (the upper jaw joint bone), was discovered in rock layers of the Chichinales Formation in Paso Córdoba, a National Protection area. In 2015, the specimen became the holotype (name-bearing) specimen of the new genus and species Patagorhacos terrificus; the generic name is a combination of Patagonia, where the fossils were found, and rhacos, the suffix of Phorusrhacos, another phorusrhacid. Other specimens have been assigned to Patagorhacos, including an incomplete ulna (forearm bone) and an associated specimen that contains parts of the skull, mandible (lower jaw), and hindlimbs. However, Patagorhacos remains poorly understood.

Patagorhacos was around the size of Patagornis, another phorusrhacid, which measured about 90–100 centimetres (3.0–3.3 ft) tall at the back and weighed 45–50 kilograms (99–110 lb). This makes it relatively small for a phorusrhacid. As a phorusrhacid, it would have a large, elongated head, elongated hindlimbs, and reduced forelimbs. Patagorhacos is generally comparable to the other small-medium sized phorusrhacids Andrewsornis and Patagornis, but differs from them in aspects of its quadrate and hindlimbs. For example, the quadrate bears an enlarged pterygoid condyle (a protuberance that articulates with the pterygoid bone), a characteristic absent in other phorusrhacids. The mandibular fragment is in worn condition, but bears a prominent tomial (cutting) edge on its dorsal side. Until the description of additional remains in 2025, several studies doubted the phorusrhacid affinities of Patagorhacos. A phylogenetic analysis suggests it was related to Andalgalornis, Andrewsornis, and Patagornis.

Patagorhacos' fossils were discovered in rock layers of the Chichinales Formation, which is part of the wider Neuquén Group. This environment was made up of flood plains, open grasslands, and patches of woodlands, which hosted a diverse fauna of mammals. This included meridiungulates like Cochilius, Cramauchenia, and Hegetotheriopsis, xenarthrans like Stenotatus, rodents like Australoprocta, and marsupials like Cladosictis.

== History and taxonomy ==
Tarsometatarsus and foot elements of MPCN-PV-1003

Fossils assigned to Patagorhacos were first discovered by an expedition authorized by the Río Negro Secretariat of Culture. This venture was launched by the Museo Patagónico de Ciencias Naturales to study fossils in Paso Córdoba, a Natural Protection area in Río Negro Province, southern Argentina. The remains of Patagorhacos initially discovered included just two bones: the distal (away from body) end of a right quadrate (upper jaw joint bone; cataloged at the Paleontology of Vertebrate Collection, Museo Patagónico de Ciencias Naturales under specimen number MPCN-PV-377) and the distal end of an ulna (forearm bone, MPCN-PV-379). This makes Patagorhacos one of the most fragmentary and rare phorusrhacids known. The strata of Paso Córdoba where Patagorhacos was discovered is composed of a 73 metres (240 ft) tall area of whitish-greyish tufts and clays belonging to the Chichinales Formation. This formation dates to the early Miocene (Colhuehuapian in accordance with South American land mammal age (SALMA) classification), making it between 21 and 17.5 million years old. In 2015, Argentina paleontologists Federico Agnolín and Pablo Chafrat scientifically described the remains and assigned them to a new genus and species of phorusrhacid ("terror bird"), which they named Patagorhacos terrificus. The generic name Patagorhacos is a combination of Patagonia, the part of southern South America where its fossils were discovered, and rhacos, which was chosen for its use in the name of the type genus of the family, Phorusrhacos. The specific name "terrificus" was chosen to represent the "terrific" nature of phorusrhacids. The authors selected the quadrate as the holotype specimen (the specimen which a species is based on), while the ulna was assigned to Patagorhacos. Despite the lack of overlap, this assignment was made because both elements were found in the same locality and strata, as well as match in size.

Tibiotarsus and articulated tarsometatarsus of MPCN PV 1004

In 2025, Agnolín, Chafrat, and Argentine paleontologist Gerardo P. Álvarez-Herrera described a set of new Patagorhacos material that had been unearthed from the same site and strata as the holotype. These newly described fossils come from a single individual (MPCN-PV-1003) of an adult, consisting of: an incomplete right quadrate, dentary symphysis (the area where the dentaries meet), femur (thighbone) fragments, incomplete left tibiotarsus (shin bone), pieces of both tarsometatarsi, and an incomplete right pes (foot). MPCN-PV-1003 was found in an area covering around 1 square meter (11 sq ft). Many of these fossils are worn, cracked, or broken, giving a limited perspective on their anatomy. Another specimen (MPCN-PV-1004), the distal end of a tibiotarsus and proximal end of a tarsometatarsus, was found in articulation and is better preserved. Furthermore, the authors noted that an incomplete phorusrhacid pes from the same locale and strata as Patagorhacos may come from the genus as well. However, a 2017 conference abstract stated that this specimen comes from a hermosiornithine phorusrhacid, a group with unique tarsometatarsus anatomy compared to other phorusrhacids.

=== Classification and validity ===
In a 2021 paper, Argentine paleontologist Federico Degrange questioned Patagorhacos' original classification, stating that it was too fragmentary to identify as phorurshacid. Two years later, Tambussi and colleagues followed this conclusion and stated the genus was incertae sedis (a taxon of indeterminate classification). In their 2025 description of additional material, Agnolín and colleagues refuted this, stating that anatomical features like the presence of an elongated, dense mandibular symphysis (the area where the mandibles converge) and grooves, pits, and a concave mandibular surface. This was further supported by their phylogenetic analysis (a study of the evolutionary relationships of organisms), which recovered Patagorhacos as a valid genus in a polytomy (an unnatural grouping) with Andalgalornis, Patagornis, and Andrewsornis, three genera sometimes classified in the subfamily Patagornithinae.

In Agnolín and colleagues (2025), their phylogenetic analysis is one of the most comprehensive analyses of Phorusrhacidae yet conducted. Unlike studies like by Brazilian paleontologists Herculano Alvarenga and Elizabeth Höfling (2003), which divided Phorusrhacidae into subfamilies based on their robustness, many genera previously put in subfamilies were found in paraphyletic or polytomic groupings. Psilopterinae, for example, was broken up into successive taxa, with Psilopterus at the base of the family and Procariama more derived. The cladogram below shows the position of Patagorhacos according to an analysis by Agnolín and colleagues (2025):

- Phorusrhacidae
  - - Llallawavis
    - Procariama
    - - Psilopterus
      - - - Hermosiornis
        - - Patagornis
          - Andalgalornis
          - Andrewsornis
          - Patagorhacos
          - Phorusrhacinae
            - Phorusrhacos
            - - Physornithini
                - Physornis
                - Paraphysornis
              - - Onactornis
                - Kelenken

== Description ==
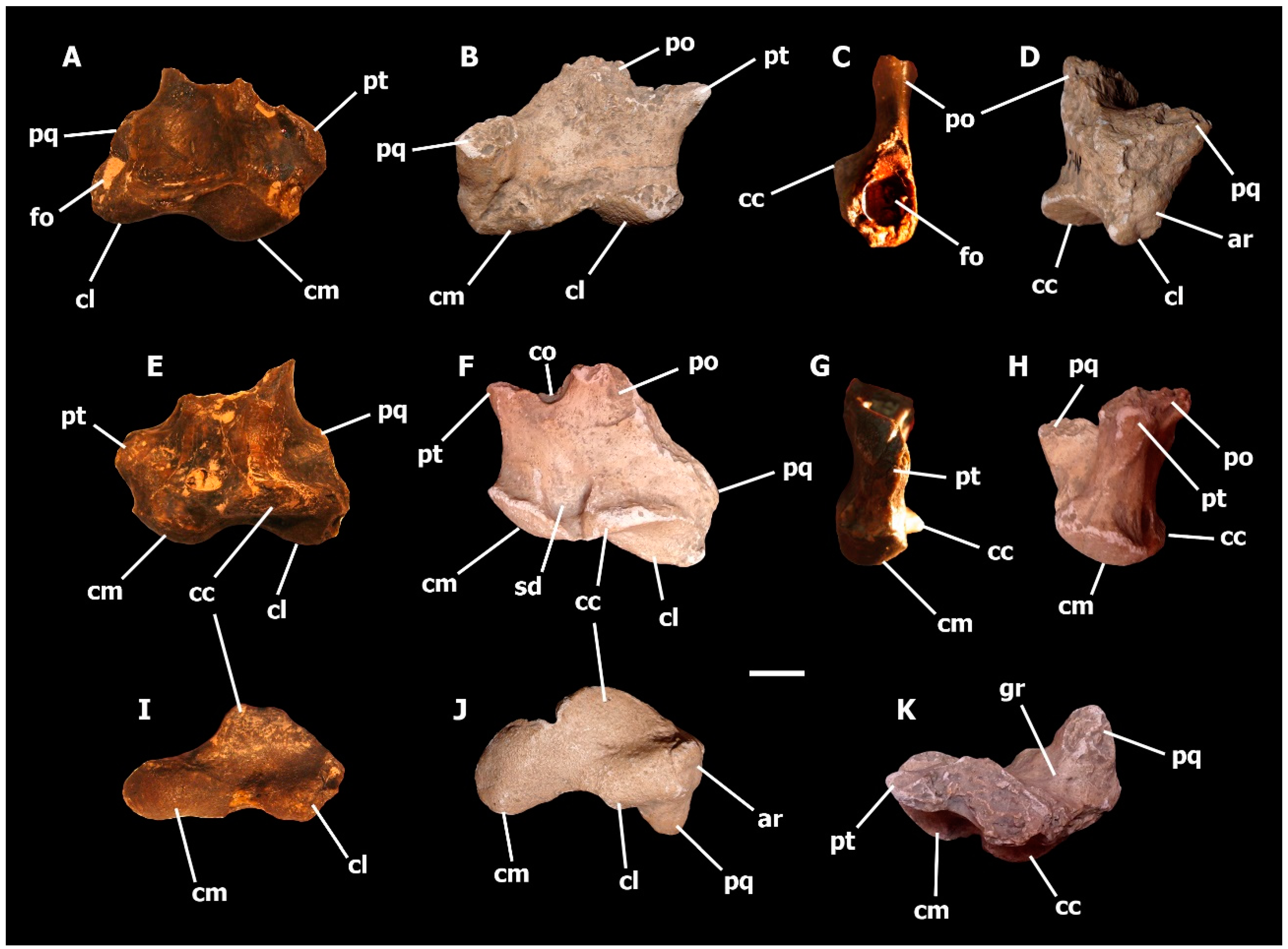
Quadrates of Patagorhacos (A, C, E, I) and Brontornis, another bird

Overall, Patagorhacos was a medium-sized phorusrhacid, comparable in size to Patagornis, an animal around 90–100 centimetres (3.0–3.3 ft) tall at the back and 45–50 kilograms (99–110 lb) in mass. One article by the MPCN stated Patagorhacos measured 1.5 metres (4.9 ft) in height and 50 kilograms (110 lb) in mass. Unlike robust, giant phorusrhacids like Kelenken, Physornis, and Onactornis, Patagorhacos' tarsometatarsus has lithe proportions and is small in size. Its slender morphology suggests it was a swift pursuit predator, which dispatched prey using its sharp beak and curved claws.

Dentary symphysis in multiple perspectives

The quadrate's body is comparably thin and compressed with strongly concave inner and outer margins. Unlike other phorusrhacids, it has a tall pterygoid condyle (a rounded protuberance on the pterygoid bone), a diagnostic trait. Furthermore, its condyles are split by a deep transverse groove. On the pterygoid condyle lies a well-developed, egg-shaped fossa (a depression in bone) on the front end of its top edge. In proximity to the pterygoid condyle and separated by a thin bone wall are two more depressions, likely pneumatic fossae. The cotyle (the part of a bone that articulates with a condyle) that receives the quadratojugal bone is deep and ovoid in shape and located above the lateral condyle. Towards the distal (away from body) end of the bone three condyles can be seen, one medial, one lateral and one caudal, each separated through each other by grooves of varying width and depth. The dentary symphysis is damaged, yet preserves many ridges and grooves on its face. The tomial (cutting) edge is prominent while the symphyseal face is strongly concave.

As for the hindlimbs, they are only represented by elements of the femur, tibiotarsus, tarsometatarsus, and right pes. The femur fragment is poorly preserved, though it does retain its robust shape, spheroidal head (the end of the femur that articulates with the pelvis) shape, and strongly divided neck. In contrast, Andrewsornis' femoral head is enlarged and more comparable to that of Patagornis than Patagorhacos. The tarsometatarsus is known from a section of the diaphysis and the distal end. The diaphysis has a subtriangular cross-section. Its back end is marked by a thick, exposed, and distally elongated medioplantar crest (a ridge of bone). The distal end shows an ellipsoidal cross-section. While the tarsometatarsus of has a subrectangular-shaped trochlea III (a ridge on the distal end of the tarsometatarsus) in front view, Patagornis' is subtriangular-shaped instead. The ulna referred to Patagorhacos is poorly preserved and suffered heavily from erosion. However, it can be determined that the diaphysis was rather thin and the dorsal condyle (the area where the ulna articulates with the humerus) was well developed. In side view, this condyle is notably less prominent than those of Patagornis, Paraphysornis, and Mesembriornis.

== Paleoenvironment ==
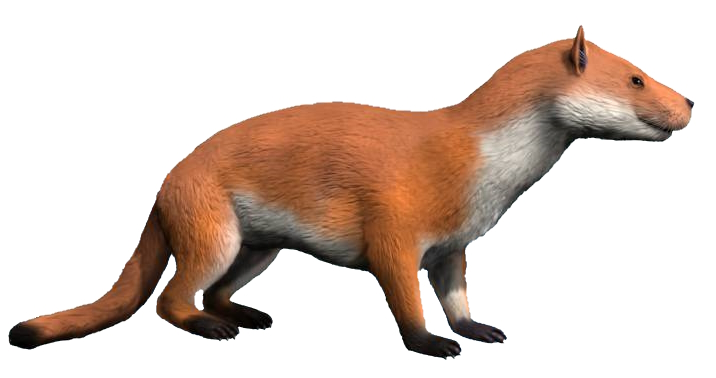
Life restoration of Cladosictis, a sparassodont that coexisted with Patagorhacos

The Chichinales Formation is part of the larger Neuquén Basin, which takes up much of Neuquén Province and lies west of the Andean Volcanic Belt. is made up of pyroclastic deposits, volcaniclastic and fine sandstones, and mudstones, in contrast to the conglomerates and coarse sandstones prevalent in the underlying El Palo Formation. The geologic makeup of the former suggests that it was an open floodplain region that experienced irregular flooding events and volcanic ashfalls. Its floodplains were interspersed with isolated sandy channels in an overall low-medium energy fluvial system. During the Miocene, the Chichinales Formation had a semi-arid to temperate climate with wide, open environments. There was little relief, restricted wooded areas with temporary water bodies. This is consistent with many Miocene Patagonian ecosystems, such as the Santacrucian-aged Santa Cruz Formation. The flora includes Nothofagus, the southern beech. Non-mammalian animals known consists of reptiles like the lizard Callopistes, an indeterminate crocodyliform, the turtle Chelonoidis, and the tortoise Geochelone. Besides Patagorhacos, phorusrhacids are represented by an incomplete tibiotarsus that was assigned to an indeterminate form of psilopterine prior to the description of Patagorhacos. Other birds recovered include an unnamed charadriiform and the rheiid Opisthodactylus horacioperezi, which was described alongside Patagorhacos. The mammalian fauna is much better represented, such as by meridungulates, xenarthrans, rodents, and metatherians. Meridungulates are purely known from herbivores like the interatheriid Cochilius, hegetotheriids Hegetotheriopsis and Hegetotherium, macraucheniid Cramauchenia, and notoungulate Colpodon are known. Xenarthrans are represented by an unnamed glyptodont, Proeutatus, and Stenotatus, meanwhile the carnivorous sparassodont Cladosictis is the only metatherian known. Rodents are represented by genera like the chinchillid Eoviscaccia, the dasyproctid Australoprocta, and an unnamed octodontoid.

Phorusrhacids had significant ecological overlap with sparassodonts, a clade of carnivorous marsupials, from the Eocene until the Pliocene. Although phorusrhacids have previously been considered drivers of sparassodont extinctions, recent studies such as by Australian researcher Camilo López-Aguirre and colleagues (2017) state that the number of phorusrhacid species is too low to have been a major driver of sparassodont extinctions. Instead, the two have significant overlap in many sites, including in the Chinchinales Formation. This suggests that there may have been niche partitioning between the two groups, with the phorusrhacids typically being cursorial whereas sparassodonts were mostly scansorial. However, predation between the two or competition for medium-sized prey may have been prevalent.
