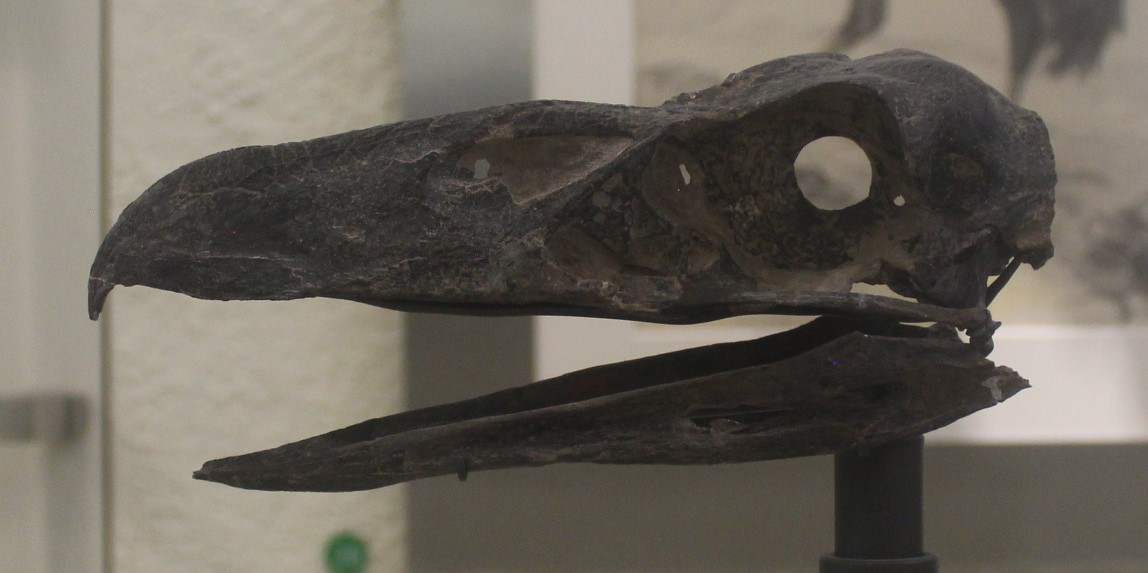
- Skull of P. lemoinei in American Museum of Natural History

Scientific classification
- Kingdom: Animalia
- Phylum: Chordata
- Class: Aves
- Order: Cariamiformes
- Family: †Phorusrhacidae
- Subfamily: †Psilopterinae
- Genus: †Psilopterus; Moreno & Mercerat, 1891

Species
- P. bachmanni (Moreno & Mercerat, 1891) (type); P. lemoinei (Moreno & Mercerat, 1891); P. affinis (Ameghino, 1899); P. colzecus Tonni & Tambussi, 1988

Synonyms
- Pelecyornis Ameghino, 1891; Staphylornis Mercerat, 1897

= Psilopterus =

Psilopterus Temporal range: Mid Oligocene-Late Pleistocene? (Deseadan-Lujanian) ~29.0–0.1 Ma

Extinct genus of birds

Psilopterus (Greek for "bare wing") is an extinct genus of phorusrhacid ("terror bird") from the Middle Oligocene to possibly the Late Pleistocene of Argentina and Uruguay. Compared to other phorusrhacids, members of the genus are both relatively gracile and diminutive, and include the smallest known species of terror bird: with the head raised P. bachmanni was 70–80 centimeters (2.3–2.6 ft) in height and weighed about 5 kilograms (11 lb), while the largest members of the genus were only about 8 kilograms (18 lb). The birds resemble the modern cariama (Cariama cristata), except with a heavier build and considerably smaller wings. Fossil finds in Uruguay indicate the genus may have survived until 96,040 ± 6,300 years ago, millions of years after the larger phorusrhacids became extinct.

== Description and taxonomy ==
The most recent systematic revision of Phorusrhacidae placed Psilopterus within the subfamily Psilopterinae, along with the genera Procariama and Paleopsilopterus, and divided Psilopterus into four species.

=== Psilopterus bachmanni ===
Psilopterus bachmanni (Moreno & Mercerat, 1891) is the smallest species of phorusrhacid, rivaled only by P. affinis. The species (and genera) is defined by the upper portion of a fused ankle and leg bone (the lectotype MLP-168 is a tarsometatarsus). Other material assigned the species includes additional leg bones that are probably from the same bird, and an almost complete skeleton (PUM-15.904) The material is from several sites in the Santa Cruz Formation in the Santa Cruz Province of Argentina dating to the Middle Miocene (Santacrucian). The most important diagnostic characteristics are a low skull and upper jaw (or maxilla; similar to the mesembriornithine phorusrhacids) and the extreme slant of the front edge of the hole just before the eye (rostal portion of the antorbital fenestra), though there are also differences in the rest of the skeleton.

Synonyms:

- Psilopterus bachmanni (Moreno & Mercerat, 1891)
- Patagornis bachmanni Moreno & Mercerat, 1891
- Psilopterus communis Moreno & Mercerat, 1891
- Psilopterus intermedius Moreno & Mercerat, 1891
- Phororhacos delicatus Amegino, 1891

Brodkorb considered Psilopterus minutus Amerghino, 1981 a separate species, but the incomplete foot bone (tarsometatarsus) is indistinguishable from P. bachmanni.

=== Psilopterus lemoinei ===
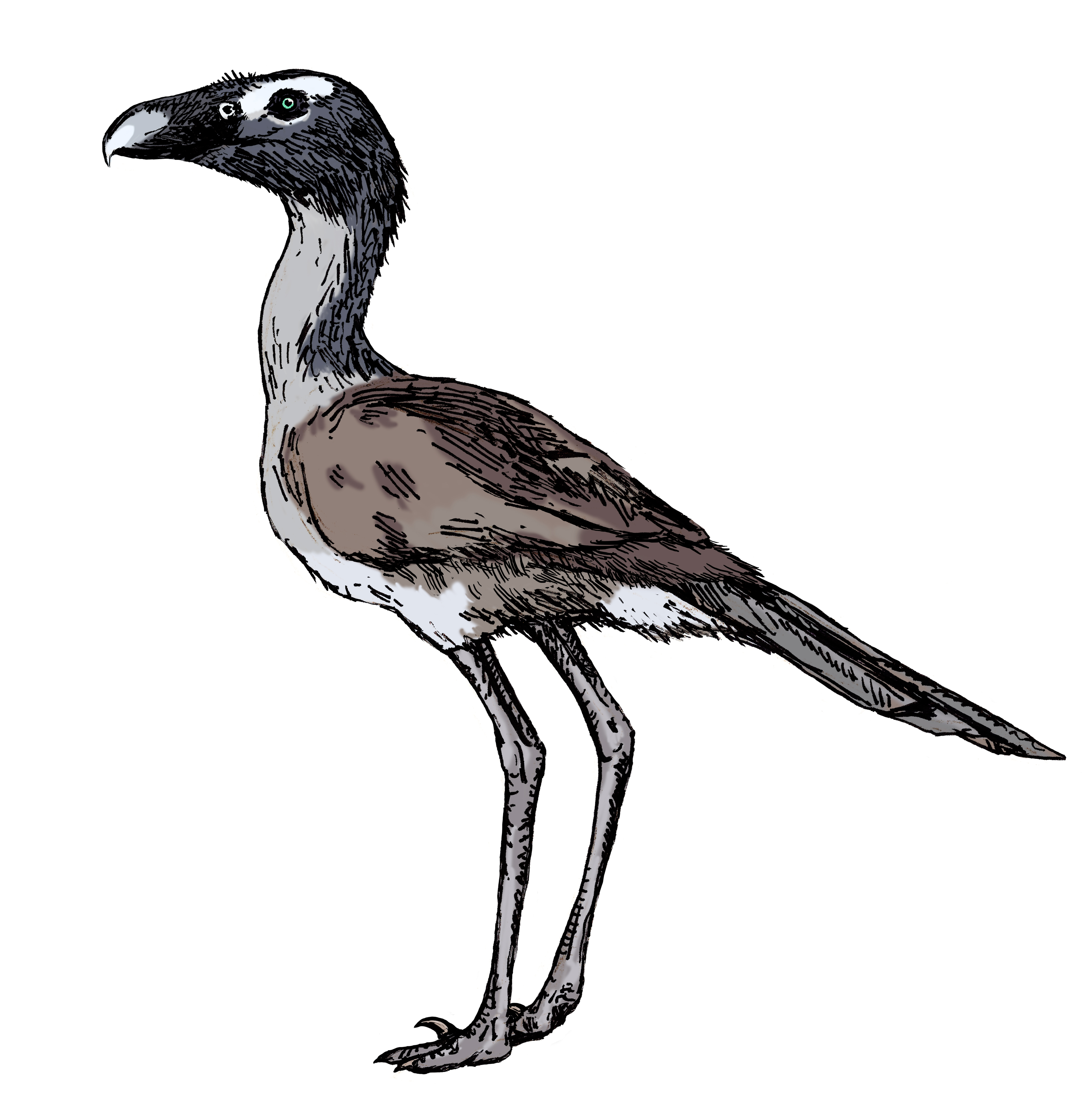
Life restoration of P. lemoinei

Psilopterus lemoinei (Moreno & Mercerat, 1891) is contemporaneous with P. bachmanni and likely filled a very similar ecological niche, though P. lemoinei is slightly larger, with an estimated weigh approaching 8 kilograms (18 lb). The species is defined by part of a lower leg bone (the lectotype, MLP-162, is the distal end of a tibiotarsus), but a wide variety of material has been referred to the taxon. This material has been found at a number of sites in the Monte León and Santa Cruz Formations in the Santa Cruz Province of Argentina that are dated to the Middle Miocene (Santacrucian). Diagnostic characteristics include a higher skull and upper jaw (maxilla), and the front portion of the hole in front of the eyes (rostral edge of the antorbital fenestra) is less slanted. Additional differences in the remainder of the skeleton are noted in Sinclair and Farr (1932). A number of discrepancies between various specimens have been attributed to differences in age or sex, but material currently assigned to P. lemonei and P. bachmanni may be reclassified at the species level if reexamined in depth.

Synonyms:

- Patagornis lemoinei Moreno & Mercerat, 1891
- Psilopterus australis Moreno & Mercerat, 1891
- Pelecyornis tubulatus Ameghino, 1895 (synonym of Psilopterus australis)
- Phororhacos modicus Ameghino, 1895
- Staphylornis gallardoi Mercerat, 1897 (possible synonym of Psilopterus australis)
- Staphylornis erythacus Mercerat, 1897 (possible synonym of Psilopterus australis)
- Pelecyornis tenuirostris Sinclair & Farr, 1932 (synonym of Psilopterus australis)

=== Psilopterus affinis ===
Psilopterus affinis (Ameghino, 1899) is the most poorly known species of terror bird, represented only by part of a leg bone (tarsometatarsus, MACN-A-52-184) which indicates the bird was very close to P. bachmanni in size. P. affinis is one of several species known from fragmentary material found in 1899 in the Chubut Province of Argentina (Patagonia), in rocks which dated to the Middle to Late Oligocene (Deseadan). Additional specimens might help clarify the taxonomy of the four apparently unrelated species. P. affinis was originally assigned to the genus Phororhacos (lapsus calami of Phorusrhacos) despite the difference in size, and is distinguished from P. bachmanni by a groove on the leg bone. Bertelli et al. kept this species in Phororhacos. Brodkorb assigned the species to Andrewsornis in 1967, but this is no longer considered accurate.

=== Psilopterus colzecus ===
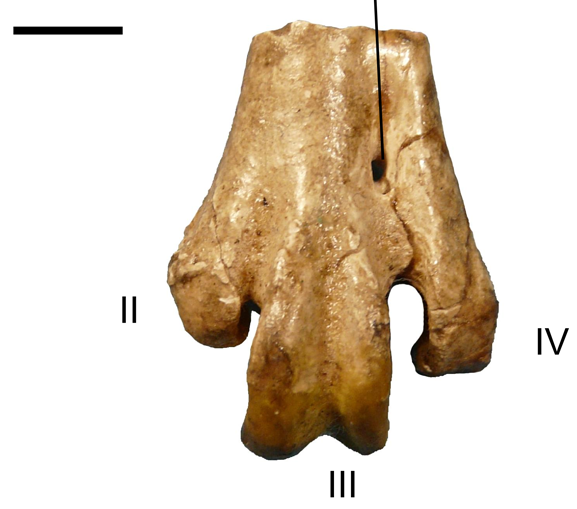
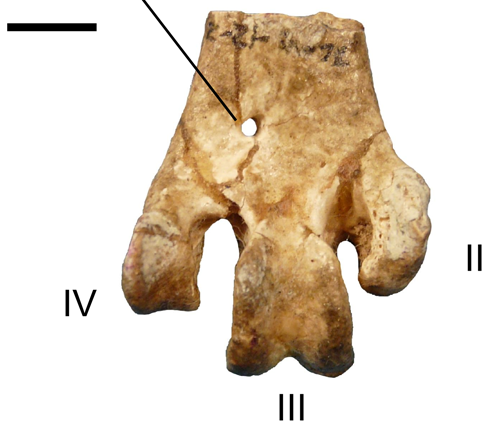
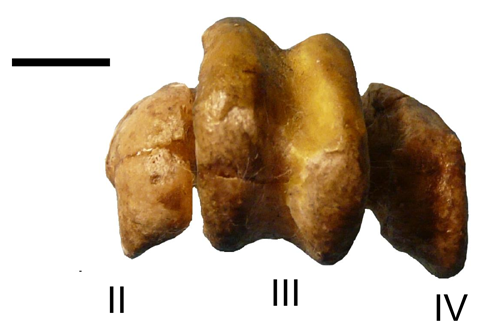
P. colzecus tarsometatarsus from the front, back, and below

The most recently discovered species in the genus, Psilopterus colzecus Tonni & Tambussi, 1988, is similar to P. lemoinei in size. Known only from a single incomplete skeleton that includes parts of the jaw, arm, and leg (holotype MLP-76-VI-12-2), the species is defined by a groove in the front of the thigh bone (trochlea). The elements were found in the Arroyo Chasicó Formation in Buenos Aires Province of Argentina and are dated to the Late Miocene (Chasicoan).

== Classification ==
When P. bachmanni was originally described in 1891, few other birds now known as Phorusrhacids were described, but when Moreno & Mercerat named the taxon, they assigned Psilopterus (then Patagornis) bachmanni to a group with Phorusrhacos, Mesembriornis, and Stereornis, though the latter is now seen as a synonym of Phorusrhacos, that they named Stereornithidae. Since then, Psilopterus was considered the ancestor of larger Phorusrhacids like Mesembriornis and the modern Cariama. In 1927, Psilopterus was placed in its own family and subfamily, Psilopterinae, and later recognized as being in its own family sometimes grouped with other Phorusrhacids like Palaeopsilopterus and Procariama. However, in the phylogenetic analysis by Degrange et al. (2015), Psilopterus was found as the only psilopterine, though a 2024 study reclassified Procariama as a psilopterine. The following phylogenetic tree shows the internal relationships of Phorusrhacidae under the exclusion of Brontornis as published by Degrange and colleagues in 2015, which recovers Psilopterus as the only member of Psilopterinae as a sister clade to Mesembriornithinae.

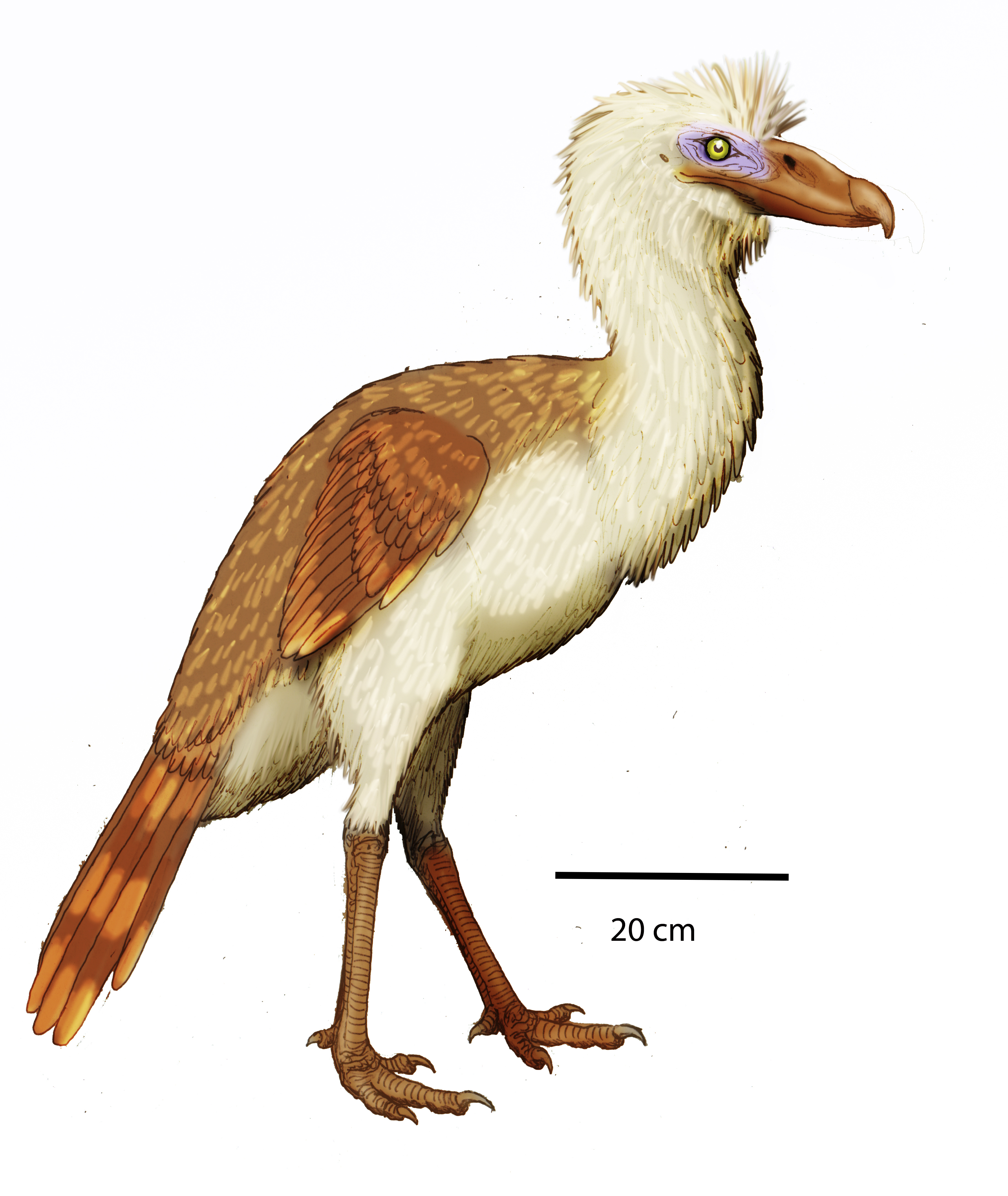
Restoration of P. bachmanni

- Cariamiformes
  - Cariamidae
  - Phorusrhacidae
    - - Mesembriornithinae
        - Mesembriornis incertus
        - - Mesembriornis milneedwardsi
          - - Llallawavis scagliai
            - Procariama simplex
      - Psilopterinae
        - - Psilopterus affinis
          - Psilopterus bachmanni
        - - Psilopterus colzecus
          - Psilopterus lemoinei
    - - Kelenken guillermoi
      - - Devincenzia pozzi
        - - Titanis walleri
          - - Paraphysornis brasiliensis
            - - Andrewsornis abbotti
              - Andalgalornis steulleti
              - Patagornis marshi
              - Phorusrhacos longissimus
              - Physornis fortis

== Paleobiology ==
The strong morphological similarity between the claws of the predatory cariama and Psilopterus, both of which are sharp, curved, and laterally compressed, may indicate they were used to strike prey. Like modern seriemas, psilopterines like Psilopterus would have fed on smaller animals based on their osteological traits. It has been also suggested that, in contrast to the other larger terror birds, Psilopterus may have been able to fly, probably in a brief and clumsy manner like that of extant seriemas, with body mass estimates and hind limb proportions of psilopterines being similar to those of certain birds like Psophia and Otis which often walk but are able to run and fly. It is likely that psilopterines would have more preferred to run than fly, and that they would have utilized flight to reach the treetops for nesting and protection against predators.

== Paleoenvironment ==
Psilopterus bachmanni and lemoinei lived during the middle Miocene in the Santa Cruz Formation, which preserves mostly a coastal environment, but also forested and grassland regions. The area had little rainfall, so forests developed around lakes and rivers, giving Santa Cruz a diverse environment. During the Miocene, the climate was similar to those of the coasts of Chile with semi-temperate forests and oceanic winds. Grasslands began spreading into Argentina during the Miocene, though much of inner Patagonia was still arid with small rainforests in between. Large, herbivorous, South American notoungulate mammals like the toxodontids Nesodon and Adinotherium were the large low browsers, with rabbit-like interatheriiid Protypotherium being frugivorous. Both mammalian and avian carnivores inhabited the area, the largest being the phorusrhacid Phorusrhacos. Marsupials also lived in the region, including the large carnivorous sparassodont Borhyaena. Psilopterus lemoinei is also known from the coastal Monte Leon Formation that was in the same region in Santa Cruz, but part of the older lower Miocene age. Monte Leon preserved more mudstone and estuarine sediments, but with a very similar fauna to the Santa Cruz Formation as the two formations had a direct transition.
