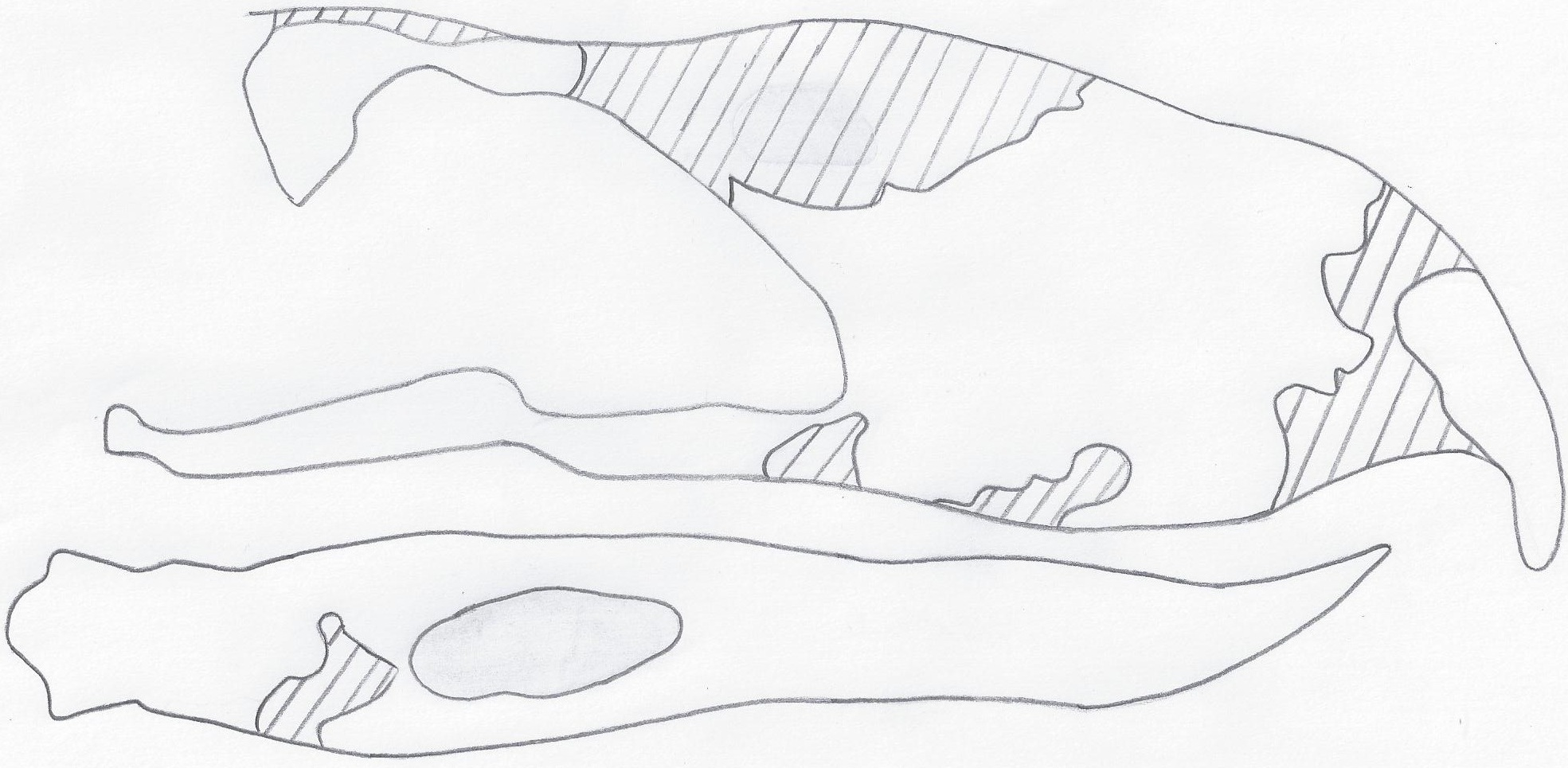
- A sketch of the holotype specimen's skull

Scientific classification
- Kingdom: Animalia
- Phylum: Chordata
- Class: Aves
- Order: Cariamiformes
- Family: †Phorusrhacidae
- Subfamily: †Patagornithinae
- Genus: †Andrewsornis; Patterson, 1941
- Species: †A. abbotti

Binomial name
- †Andrewsornis abbotti Patterson, 1941

Synonyms
- Aucornis solidus? Ameghino, 1898

= Andrewsornis =

Andrewsornis Temporal range: Oligocene (Deseadan) ~29.0 Ma

Extinct genus of birds

Andrewsornis is an extinct genus of giant flightless predatory birds of the family Phorusrhacidae or "terror birds" that lived in Oligocene Argentina. Fossils have been found in the Sarmiento Formation, and possibly the Agua de la Piedra Formation.

== Discovery and naming ==
Fossils of Andrewsornis were first discovered on 18 September 1923 by fossil collector John Bernard Abbott in Cabeza Blanca in the province of Chubut, Patagonia in southern Argentina. Abbott was a member of the Marshall Field Paleontological Expeditions, a series of Field Museum expeditions led by paleontologist Elmer Riggs that explored fossiliferous outcrops in Argentina and Bolivia between 1922 and 1927. The Marshall Field Paleontological Expeditions unearthed many phorusrhacid fossils, however their description was delayed by World War II. The remains found consisted of an incomplete skull, both mandibles (lower jaws), the proximal (towards body) section of the coracoid (shoulder bone), and two ungual phalanges (finger bones) from the second digit. These specimens make up the holotype (name-bearing) specimen, which was deposited at the Field Museum under specimen number FM-P13417. The strata of the Cabeza Blanca where the fossils were found corresponds to the Deseado Formation, which comes from the Deseadan SALMA (South American land mammal age) and the middle-upper Oligocene.

In 1941, paleontologist Bryan Patterson scientifically described the remains as belonging to a new genus and species of phorusrhacid, which he named Andrewsornis abbotti. The generic name is in honor of Charles William Andrews, a British paleontologist who specialized in fossil birds, and the Greek root "ornis" meaning "bird". The specific name abbotti is in honor of John Bernard Abbott, an experienced fossil collector and the discoverer of the specimen. Since its initial description, few academic studies of the Andrewsornis have been made. In 2003, a study by paleontologists Herculano Alvarenga and Elizabeth Höfling referred a mandibular symphysis (part of the mandible where the two jaws fuse) and a left femur (thighbone) to Andrewsornis based on its origin and size. Additionally, the study stated that Aucornis solidus, a species described in 1898 by paleontologist Florentino Ameghino on the basis of a single phalanx, is likely a synonym, of Andrewsornis. However, this cannot be proven due to the lack of diagnostic traits for phalanges. The study simply stated that Aucornis solidus is simply a species inquirenda.

== Description ==
Andrewsornis is so far the largest member of the subfamily Patagornithinae, having a height of 1.8 m (5.9 ft) and weighing up to 60–89 kg (132–196 lb). The genus is generally very similar to Phorusrhacos, but differs in that: the skull is slightly flatter, front edge of the antorbital fenestra is strongly sloping, the lower jaw is 39 cm long and slimmer than Phorusrhacos's. With a length of 10 cm, the symphysis mandibulae is more similar to that in Andalgalornis and Patagornis. The Fenestrae Mandibulares are longer and larger than in Patagornis and Andalgalornis, have an oval shape.

== Classification ==
In 2003 during their redescription of phorusrhacidae, Herculano Alvarenga and Elizabeth Hofling created a new subfamily, Patagornithinae, with Patagornis as the type genus, that included Andrewsornis and Andalgalornis. Andrewsornis is similar to Patagornis and Andalgalornis in that they all are medium-sized phorusrhacids with slender, lightly built bodies, long and narrow mandibular symphyses, and long and slender tibiotarsi and tarsometatarsi. However, a phylogenetic analysis in 2015 by Degrange et al. found Andrewsornis in a merged Phorusrhacinae and in polytomy with Physornis and Phorusrhacos as well. The following phylogenetic tree shows the internal relationships of Phorusrhacidae under the exclusion of Brontornis as published by Degrange and colleagues in 2015, which recovers a clade that contains Physornis, Phorusrhacos and Andalgalornis, among others.

- Cariamiformes
  - Cariamidae
  - Phorusrhacinae
    - - Mesembriornithinae
        - Mesembriornis incertus
        - - Mesembriornis milneedwardsi
          - - Llallawavis scagliai
            - Procariama simplex
      - Psilopterinae
        - - Psilopterus affinis
          - Psilopterus bachmanni
        - - Psilopterus colzecus
          - Psilopterus lemoinei
    - - Kelenken guillermoi
      - - Devincenzia pozzi
        - - Titanis walleri
          - - Paraphysornis brasiliensis
            - - Andrewsornis abbotti
              - Andalgalornis steulleti
              - Patagornis marshi
              - Phorusrhacos longissimus
              - Physornis fortis

== Palaeobiology ==
=== Life history ===
Based on osteohistological analysis of its hindlimbs, Andrewsornis exhibited an uninterrupted growth life history strategy, similar to that of other large and flightless neognaths but differing from that of megafaunal palaeognath birds.
