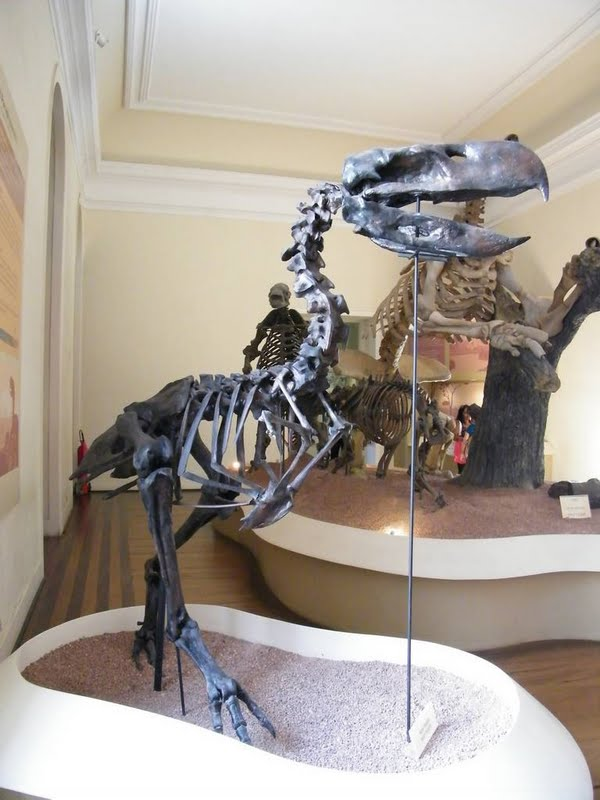
- Reconstructed skeleton, National Museum, Rio de Janeiro

Scientific classification
- Kingdom: Animalia
- Phylum: Chordata
- Class: Aves
- Order: Cariamiformes
- Family: †Phorusrhacidae
- Genus: †Paraphysornis; Alvarenga, 1993

Type species
- †Physornis brasiliensis Alvarenga, 1982

= Paraphysornis =

Paraphysornis Temporal range: Late Oligocene-Early Miocene (Deseadan) ~23 Ma

Extinct genus of birds

Paraphysornis (meaning "near Physornis") is an extinct genus of phorusrhacid ("terror bird"), an extinct group of predatory, typically large and flightless birds. It lived during the Late Oligocene to Early Miocene (around 23 million years ago) in what is now southern Brazil. It is known from a single, nearly complete skeleton that was unearthed between 1977 and 1978. In 1982, Brazilian paleontologist Herculano Alvarenga described the skeleton as coming from a new species of Physornis.

== Discovery and naming ==
The holotype (DGM-1418-R) and only known fossil was discovered by a mining company in the Taubaté Basin (São Paulo State) in a layer of bentonite clay, two or three meters below a layer of Pyrobitumen. These sediments belong to the Late Oligocene to Early Miocene Tremembé Formation. Excavation of the bones took several months between 1977 and 1978, yielding a nearly complete (75%) skeleton, only lacking most of the cranium, the pelvis and sternum. The bones were initially studied by Herculano Alvarenga, who first described them in 1982 as a species of Physornis.

Following closer examination of various phorusrhacid remains held in institutions across Europe, North America and Argentina; Alvarenga came to the conclusion that his taxon displays enough unique features to warrant a new genus distinct from Physornis, naming it Paraphysornis in a publication in 1993. The name is a combination of the genus name of Physornis and the Greek suffix "para-", in combination meaning "close to Physornis". The species name brasiliensis, coined in the initial description in 1982, reflects the animal's country of origin.

== Description ==
The mandible is well preserved but slightly distorted, with a convex lower margin and a concave cutting surface preserving no signs of a longitudinal crest (as seen in Phorusrhacos). The mandible is also wider and higher than that of Phorusrhacos, with a better developed retroarticular process and more elongated foramina. The mandible is 51.5 cm (20.3 in) long and 77 mm (3.0 in) high at the base of the mandibular symphysis. Only few elements of the cranium are preserved including the quadrates and their articulation with the mandible as well as the front of the premaxilla, which shows a strongly hooked tip as known from other phorusrhacids.

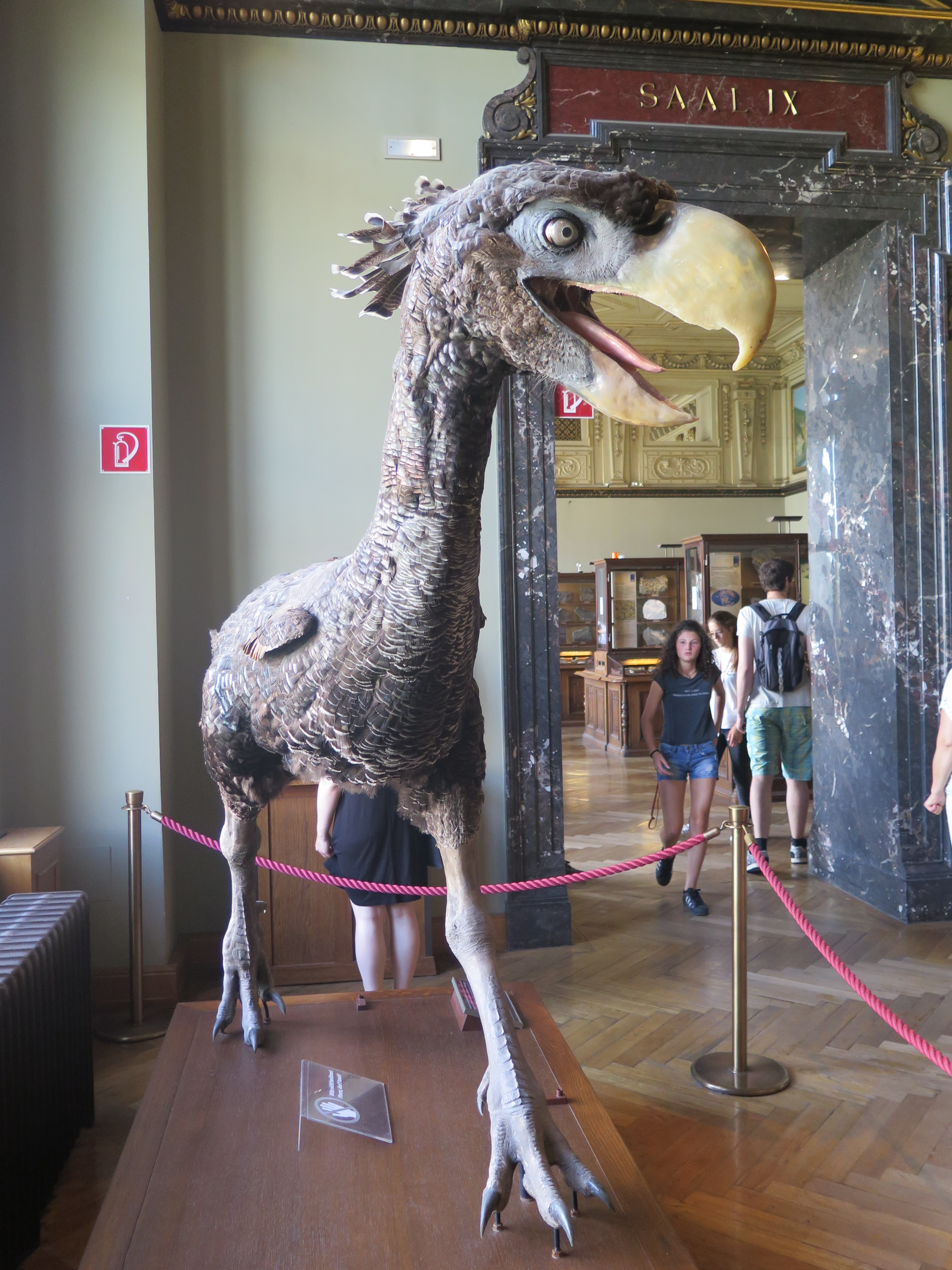
Model at the Natural History Museum, Vienna

The vertebral column is well preserved and shows the presence of thirteen cervical vertebrae displaying strong curvature (kyphosis) over cervicals one to five and a less developed curvature (lordosis) over cervicals eight to twelve, with those between these sections articulating almost straight, which gives the animal's neck the traditional avian S-curve. The atlas and axis resemble those of Mesembriornis in general shape, with the atlas being both taller and narrower than that of Psilopterus. Following the cervical series are five thoracic dorsal vertebrae followed by a 6th that is integrated into the poorly preserved pelvic region and may represent a sacral vertebra. At least the first dorsal vertebrae do not possess neural spines as high as in Psilopterus or Andalgalornis. The pelvis is too poorly preserved to give an idea of its morphology, however its anterior and superior portions are present and preserve the iliac crest, which appears similar to that of Psilopterus and Mesembriornis. Few ribs are preserved, but those that are appear robust in morphology.

The only preserved bone of the shoulder girdle is the left coracoid, which is well preserved and quite robust, with a triangular crosssection in its lower half and a more cylindrical crosssection further up. Despite the absence of a preserved sternum, clues to its anatomy can be gathered from bones that would articulate with it. Specifically, both the sternal rib and coracoid show large articular surfaces, indicating that the sternum was well developed. Almost the entire left wing is preserved with some elements also being present on the right side of the skeleton. Like in other flightless birds, the wings are heavily reduced, evenmore so than in other phorusrhacids. The humerus is heavily curved and its shaft almost elliptical in shape. It possesses a rugose ridge towards its central third which serves as an anchor point for the tensor muscle and the patagium. The humeral head is swollen and almost triangular in shape, differing significantly from the round head of extant seriemas. The ulna is preserved in excellent condition and notably more atrophied than in Mesembriornis. The radius is only partly preserved and shows an elliptical shaft turned towards the ulna. Unlike other phorusrhacids, Paraphysornis preserves no indication of quill knobs, attachment points for strong pennacious feathers. While this is no evidence for the absence of pennaceous feathers, it indicates that they were not as strongly anchored as in other members of the family.

The femur preserves both the proximal and distal ends but is missing the shaft, making it impossible to determine the exact length of the bone. However, estimates based on the proportions of Brontornis might indicate a length of 35 cm (14 in). The tibiotarsus is long, straight and robust, while the tarsometatarsus is notably short, only half the length of the tibiotarsus.

== Classification ==
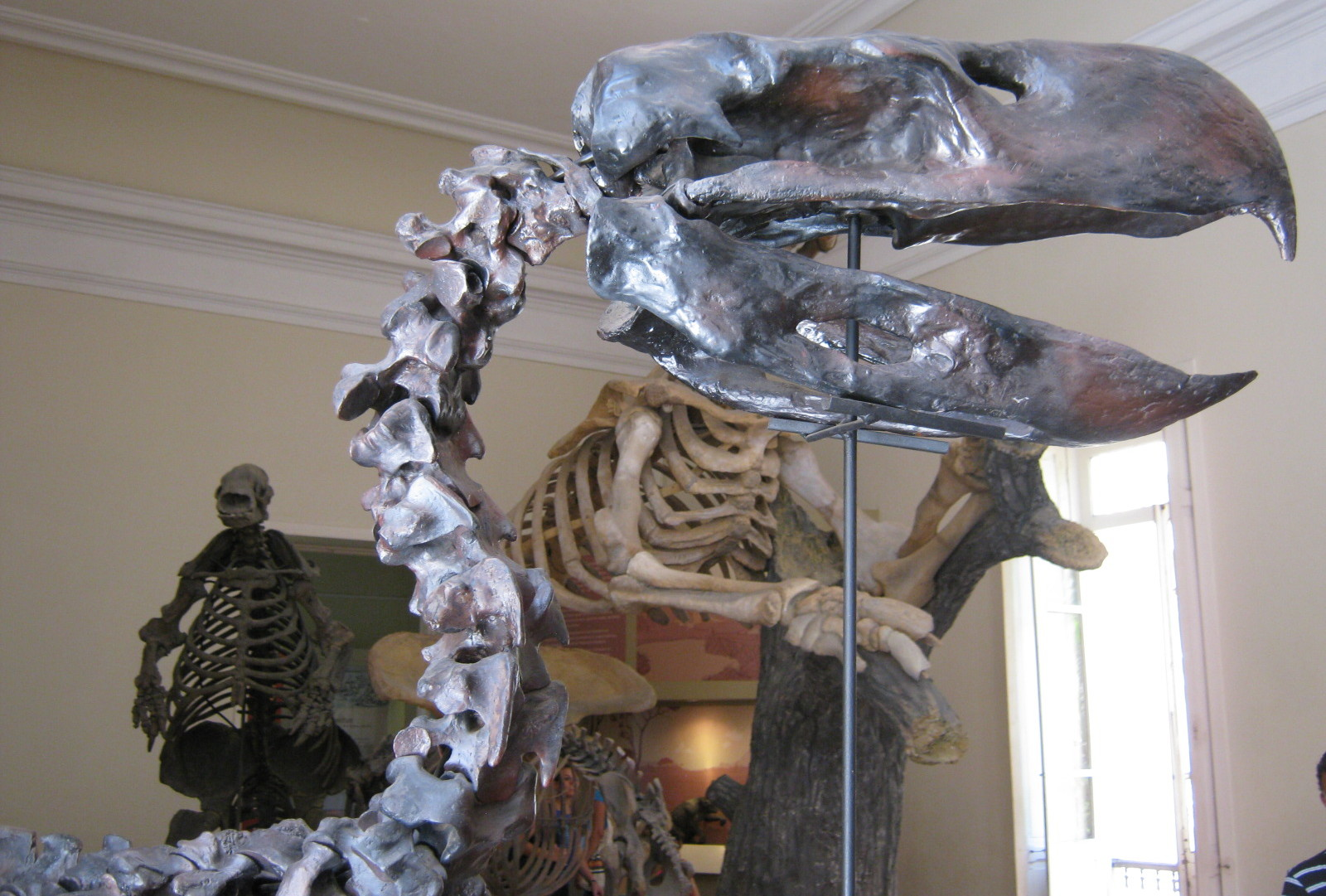
Reconstructed skull

Paraphysornis shares several characteristics with Brontornis including the shortend tarsometatarsus (only half the length of the tibiotarsus) and the morphology of the vertebrae. However the two genera also differ significantly not only in size. The phalanges of Paraphysornis are less flattened and the claws of the toes sharper. The condyles of the tibiotarsus run parallel to the axis of the shaft, while the medial condyle of Brontornis is angled similar to waterfowl. Due to these shared features, Paraphysornis is traditionally considered a member of Brontornithinae alongside Brontornis and Physornis. However, the nature of this clade has come into question, with some researchers arguing that Brontornis does in fact not represent a phorusrhacid and may instead be a gastornithiform anserimorph. Although the matter is debated, Agnolin proposed the name Physornithinae for a clade containing both Physornis and Paraphysornis.

The following phylogenetic tree shows the internal relationships of Phorusrhacidae under the exclusion of Brontornis as published by Degrange and colleagues in 2015, which recovers Paraphysornis as basal to clade that contains Physornis, Phorusrhacos and Andalgalornis, among others.

- Cariamiformes
  - Cariamidae
  - Phorusrhacinae
    - - Mesembriornithinae
        - Mesembriornis incertus
        - - Mesembriornis milneedwardsi
          - - Llallawavis scagliai
            - Procariama simplex
      - Psilopterinae
        - - Psilopterus affinis
          - Psilopterus bachmanni
        - - Psilopterus colzecus
          - Psilopterus lemoinei
    - - Kelenken guillermoi
      - - Devincenzia pozzi
        - - Titanis walleri
          - - Paraphysornis brasiliensis
            - - Andrewsornis abbotti
              - Andalgalornis steulleti
              - Patagornis marshi
              - Phorusrhacos longissimus
              - Physornis fortis

== Paleoecology ==
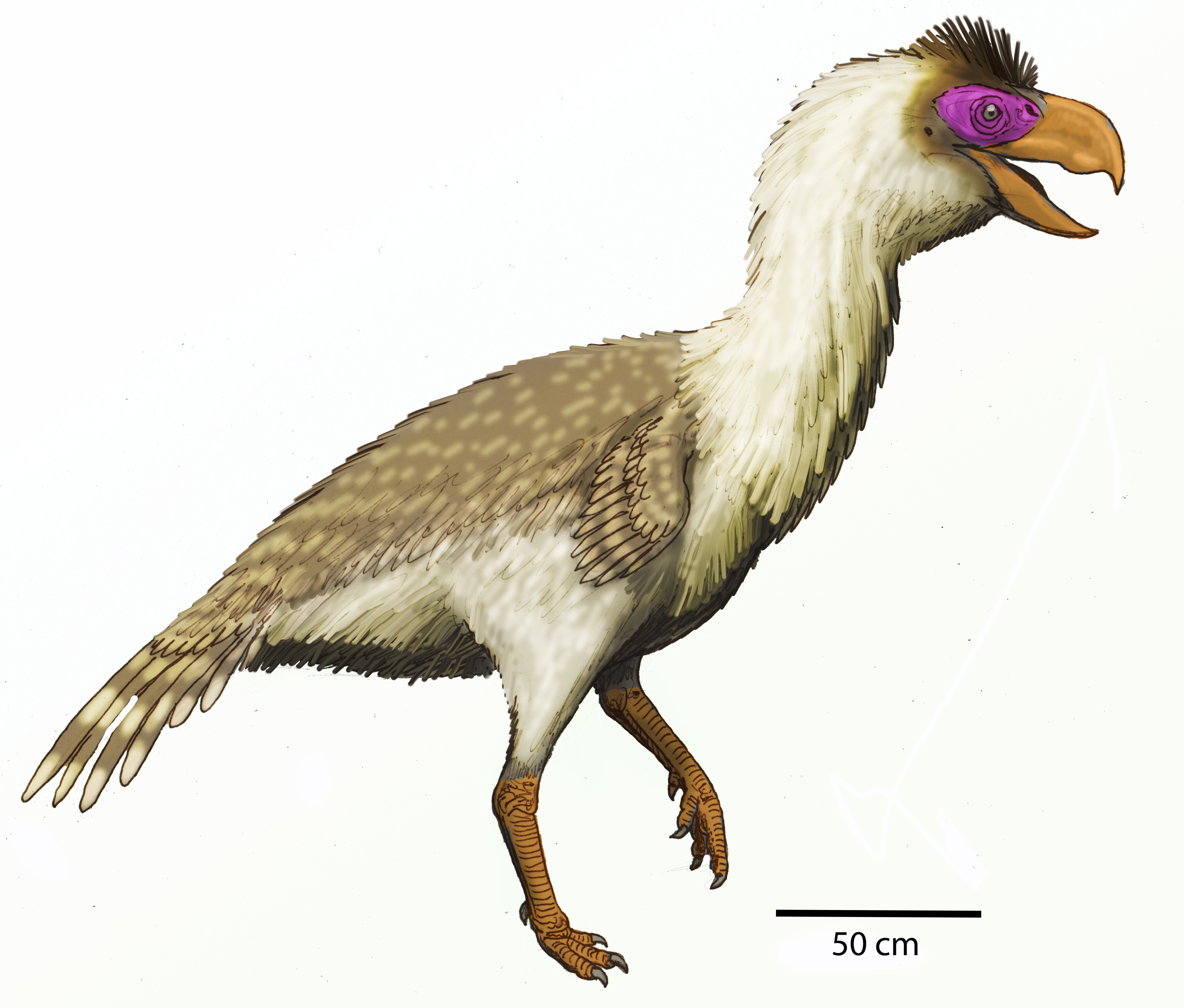
Life restoration

In birds the ability to run is proportional to the ratio between tarsometatarsus and tibiotarsus length. In Paraphysornis the tarsometatarsus is only half the length of the tibiotarsus. This was used to infer a relatively slow speed, matching the animal's increased bodymass. The method of Storer (1960) works in a similar manner, determining locomotion style according to the lengths of the two bones in addition to femur length (a method highly dependent on preservation). Applying this method likewise gives results suggesting a heavyset graviportal animal, with calculated values being similar to those of moas and elephant birds. Due to not being able to chase fast-running prey, it may have had a specific hunting method (ambush, scavenger).

The anatomy of the mandible and the shape of the claws both clearly suggest that the bird was a carnivore, like other Phorusrhacids. Alvarenga has suggested that Paraphysornis heavy stature might mean that Paraphysornis was a scavenger. However, this is not in line with other studies regarding scavenging adaptations, which suggest that scavengers can only exist through adaptations such as energy-efficient travel over long distances, impossible for a heavy, flightless bird such as Paraphysornis. Thus, it is reasonable to assume that Paraphysornis was an active predator like its relatives, leaning more towards ambushing its prey than running them down.

Paraphysornis lived during the Late Oligocene or Early Miocene in the Tremembé Formation, which preserves what is thought to be a shallow lake. Other animals present in the formation include a variety of fish, flamingos, a species of screamer, teratorns and leontiniid notoungulates.
