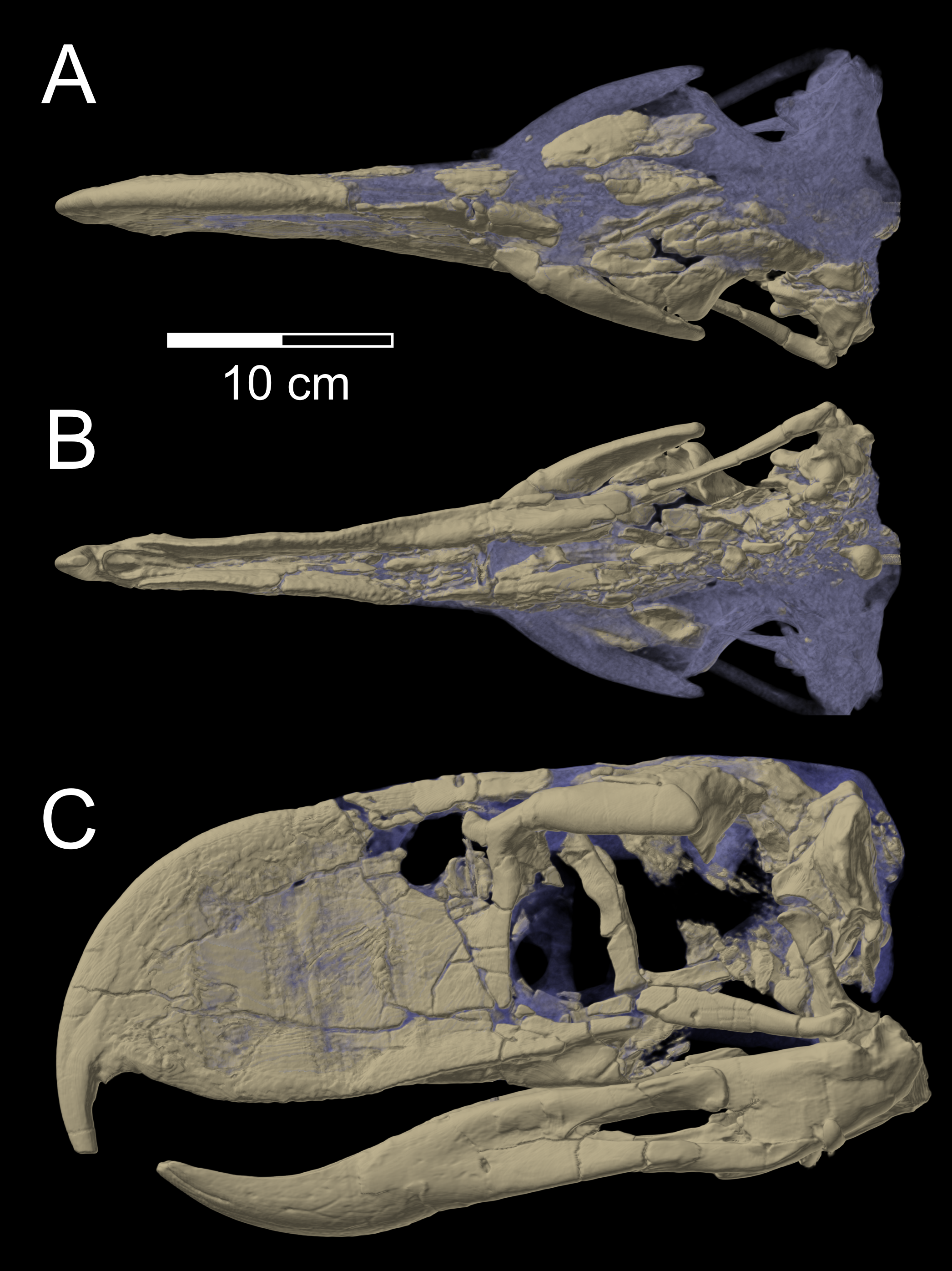
- CT scan of the skull of P 14357, holotype of A. ferox in the collections of the Field Museum of Natural History

Scientific classification
- Kingdom: Animalia
- Phylum: Chordata
- Class: Aves
- Order: Cariamiformes
- Family: †Phorusrhacidae
- Subfamily: †Patagornithinae
- Genus: †Andalgalornis; Patterson & Kraglievich, 1960
- Species: †A. steulleti

Binomial name
- †Andalgalornis steulleti (Kraglievich, 1931)

Synonyms
- List: Phororhacos steulleti Kraglievich, 1931; Phororhacos deautieri Kraglievich, 1931; Andalgalornis ferox Patterson & Kraglievich, 1960; Phorohacos deautieri Kraglievich, 1931

= Andalgalornis =

Andalgalornis Temporal range: Late Miocene (Huayquerian) ~9.0–6.8 Ma

Extinct genus of birds

Andalgalornis is a genus of flightless predatory birds of the extinct family Phorusrhacidae (often called "terror birds") that lived in Argentina. The type and only species is A. steulleti.

== Taxonomy ==
Andalgalornis is known from an incomplete skeleton and some single bones found from sites in the Entre Ríos and Catamarca Provinces of northeast and northwest Argentina. The fossils were uncovered from the Late Miocene (Huayquerian in the SALMA classification) Ituzaingó Formation of the Paraná Basin.

The following cladogram shows the position of Andalgalornis following a 2015 analysis:

- Phorusrhacidae
  - - Mesembriornithinae
      - Mesembriornis incertus
      - - Mesembriornis milneedwardsi
        - - Llallawavis scagliai
          - Procariama simplex
    - Psilopterinae
      - - - Psilopterus affinis
          - Psilopterus bachmanni
        - - Psilopterus colzecus
          - Psilopterus lemoinei
  - - Kelenken guillermoi
    - - Devincenzia pozzi
      - - Titanis walleri
        - - - Phorusrhacos longissimus
            - Andalgalornis steulleti
            - Andrewsornis abbotti
            - Patagornis marshi
            - Physornis fortis
          - Paraphysornis brasiliensis

== Description ==
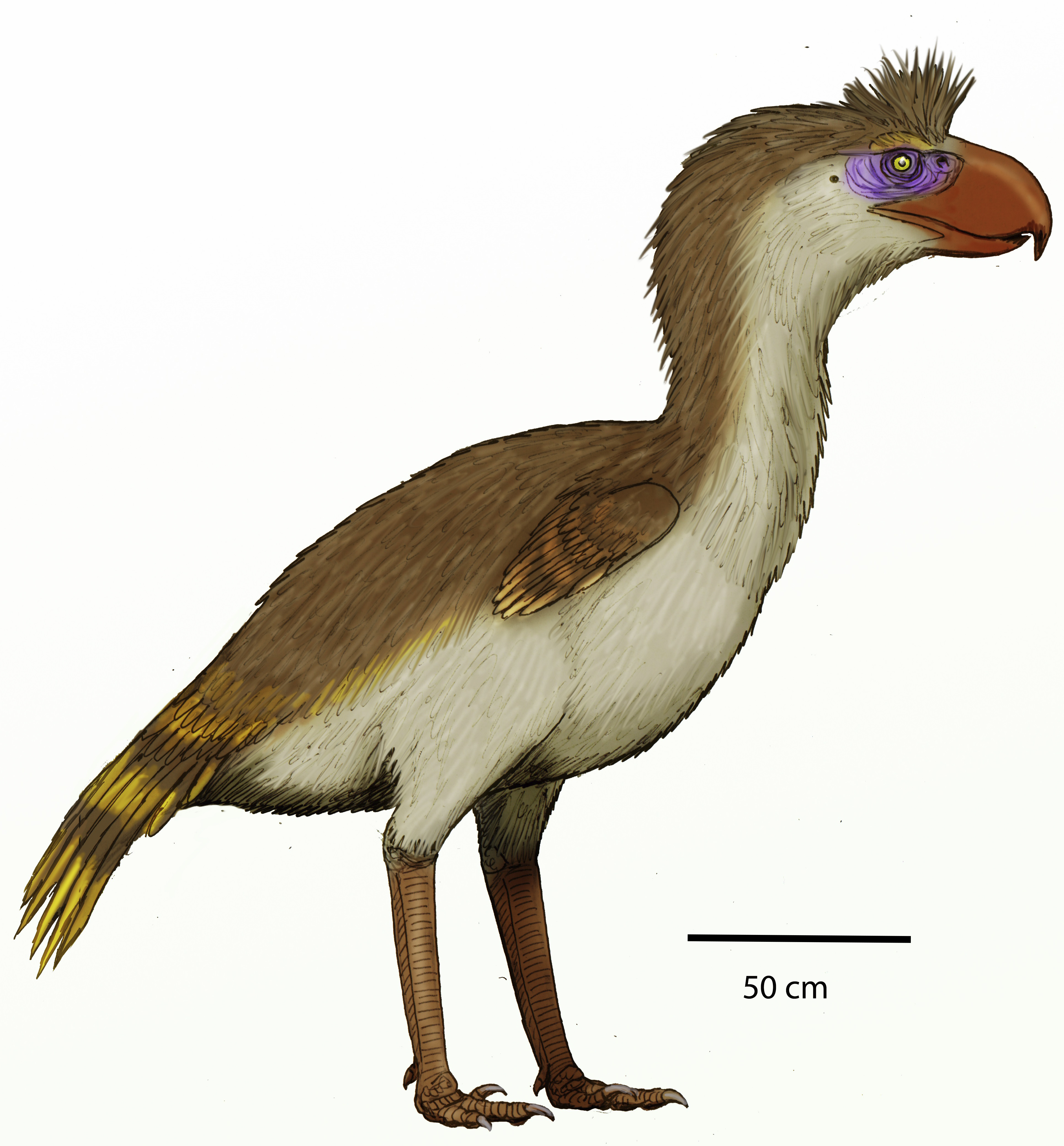
Life restoration

Around 1.4 metres (4.6 ft) tall in height, Andalgalornis is estimated to have weighed around 40 kilograms (88 lb), on the basis of the methodology proposed by Campbell and Marcus (1992). The subfamily to which the genus belonged, the Patagornithinae, contained species that were of quite slender build; it looked much like the larger phorusrhacid Phorusrhacos, but it was more elegant and smaller and had a proportionally higher beak, the most massive in proportion to body size of all phorusrhacids.

== Paleobiology ==
Phorusrhacids are thought to have been ground predators or scavengers, and have often been considered apex predators that dominated Cenozoic South America in the absence of mammalian predators, though they did co-exist with some large, carnivorous borhyaenid mammals. Earlier hypotheses of phorusrhacid feeding ecology were mainly based on them possessing large skulls with hooked beaks rather than through detailed hypotheses and biomechanical studies, and such studies of their running and predatory adaptations were only tested from the beginning of the 21st century.

Alvarenga and Elizabeth Höfling made some general remarks about phorusrhacid habits in a 2003 article. They were flightless, as evidenced by the proportional size of their wings and body mass, and wing size was more reduced in larger members of the group. They pointed out that the narrowing of the pelvis, upper maxilla, and thorax may have been adaptations for hunting in regions with high vegetation, which would permit greater agility when moving between vertical obstacles. The narrow upper maxilla would also help catching small animals hidden among tree trunks or stones. The large expansions above the eyes formed by the lacrimal bones (similar to what is seen in modern hawks) would have protected the eyes against the sun, and enabled keen eyesight, which indicates they hunted by sight in open, sunlit areas, and not shaded forests.

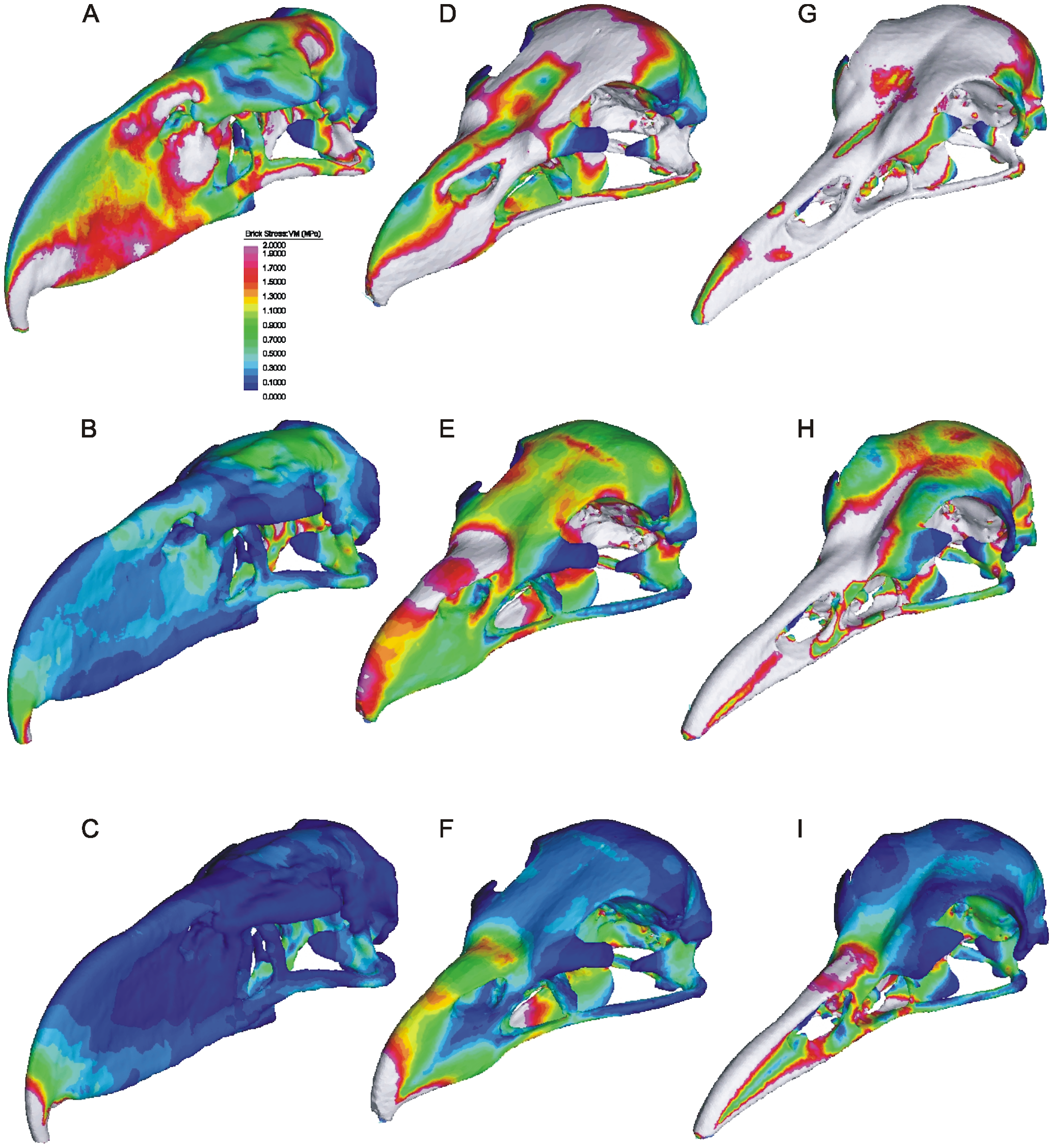
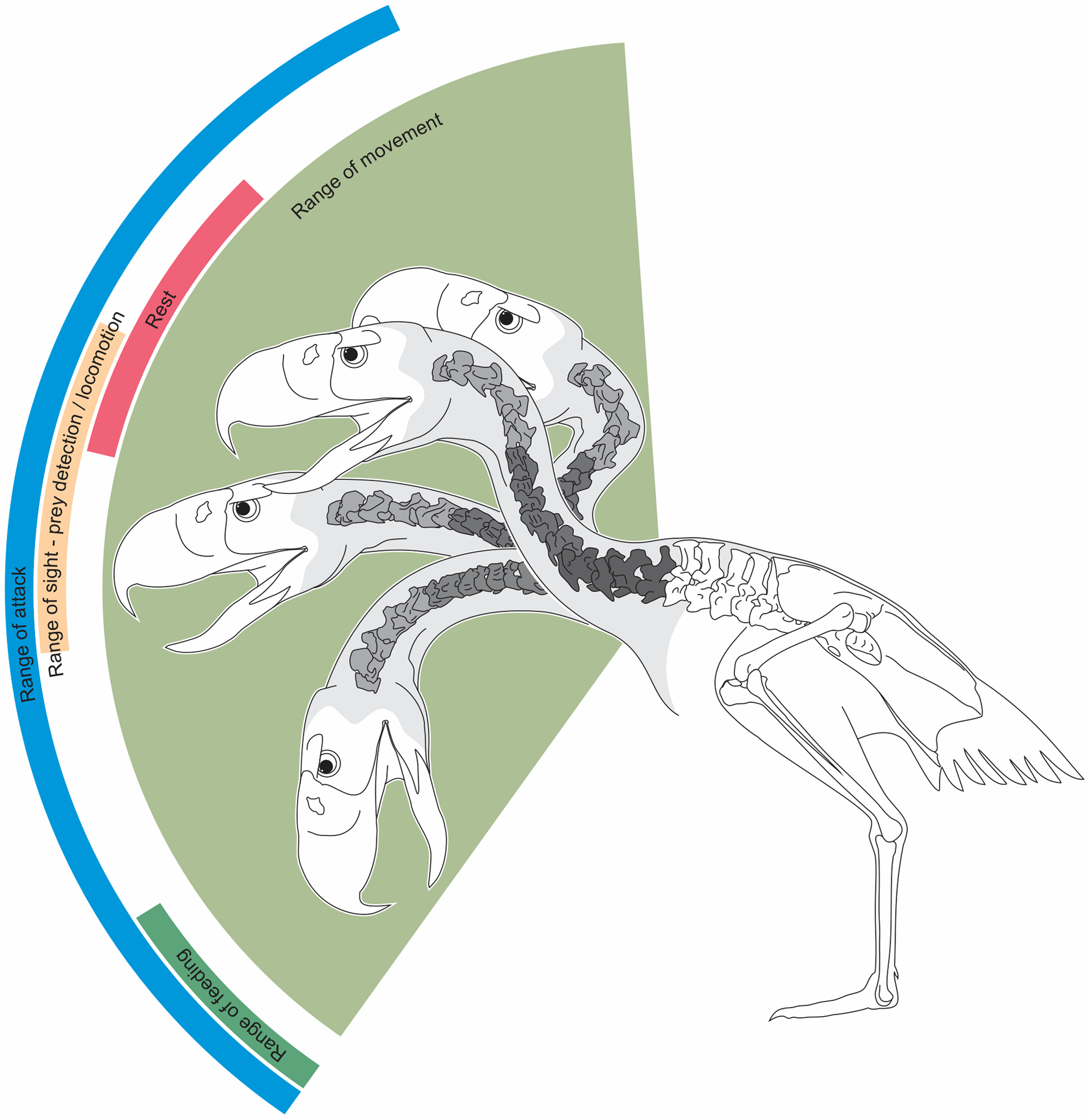
Stress distribution in bird skulls, including Andalgalornis (left, A–C), and hypothetical upwards-and-downwards range of movement of the neck in the same genus (right)

A 2010 study by Degrange and colleagues of Andalgalornis, based on Finite Element Analysis using CT scans, estimated its bite force and stress distribution in its 37-centimetre-long (15 in) skull, and showed that it had lost a large degree of intracranial immobility (mobility of skull bones in relation to each other), as was also the case for other large phorusrhacids. These researchers interpreted this loss as an adaptation for enhanced rigidity of the skull, and compared to the modern red-legged seriema and white-tailed eagle, the skull of the phorusrhacid showed relatively high stress under sideways loadings, but low stress where force was applied up and down, and in simulations of "pullback". Due to the relative weakness of the skull at the sides and middle, these researchers considered it unlikely that Andalgalornis engaged in potentially risky behavior that involved using its beak to subdue large, struggling prey. Instead, they suggested that it either fed on smaller prey that could be killed and consumed more safely, by, for example, swallowing it whole, or that when targeting large prey, it used a series of well-targeted repetitive strikes with the beak, in an "attack-and-retreat" strategy. Struggling prey could also be retained with the feet, despite the lack of sharp talons.

A 2012 follow-up study by Tambussi and colleagues analyzed the flexion abilities of the neck of Andalgalornis, based on the morphology of its neck vertebrae, finding the neck to be divided into three sections. They concluded that the neck musculature and skeleton of Andalgalornis was adapted to carrying a large head, and for helping it rise after a maximum downwards strike, and the researchers assumed the same would be true for other large, big-headed phorusrhacids. A 2020 study of phorusrhacid skull morphology by Degrange found that there were two main morphotypes within the group, derived from a seriema-like ancestor; the "Psilopterine Skull Type", which was plesiomorphic (more similar to the ancestral type), and the "Terror Bird Skull Type", which included Andalgalornis and other large members, that was more specialized, with more rigid and stiff skulls. Despite the differences, studies have shown the two types handled prey similarly, while the more rigid skulls and resulting larger bite force of the "Terror Bird" type would have been an adaptation to handling larger prey.
