= Pleistovultur =

Pleistovultur Temporal range: Late Pleistocene to Early Holocene

Scientific classification
- Kingdom: Animalia
- Phylum: Chordata
- Class: Aves
- Order: Accipitriformes
- Family: Cathartidae
- Genus: †Pleistovultur; Alvarenga et al., 2008
- Species: †P. nevesi

Binomial name
- †Pleistovultur nevesi Alvarenga et al., 2008

Extinct genus of birds

Pleistovultur is an extinct genus of large New World vulture from the Late Pleistocene or Early Holocene of South America. The type species P. nevesi was described based in a complete and well preserved right tibiotarsus from the Cuvieri cave deposits in Lagoa Santa region in Minas Gerais state, Brazil. It was larger than Sarcoramphus papa, but smaller than Vultur gryphus.

== Diet ==
P. nevesi is assumed to be a scavenger, like other New World vultures. In 2025, researchers completed the first isotopic analysis of bones found at Lajedo de Soledad, Brazil, which indicated that Pleistovultur fed primarily on animal carcasses in open areas.
