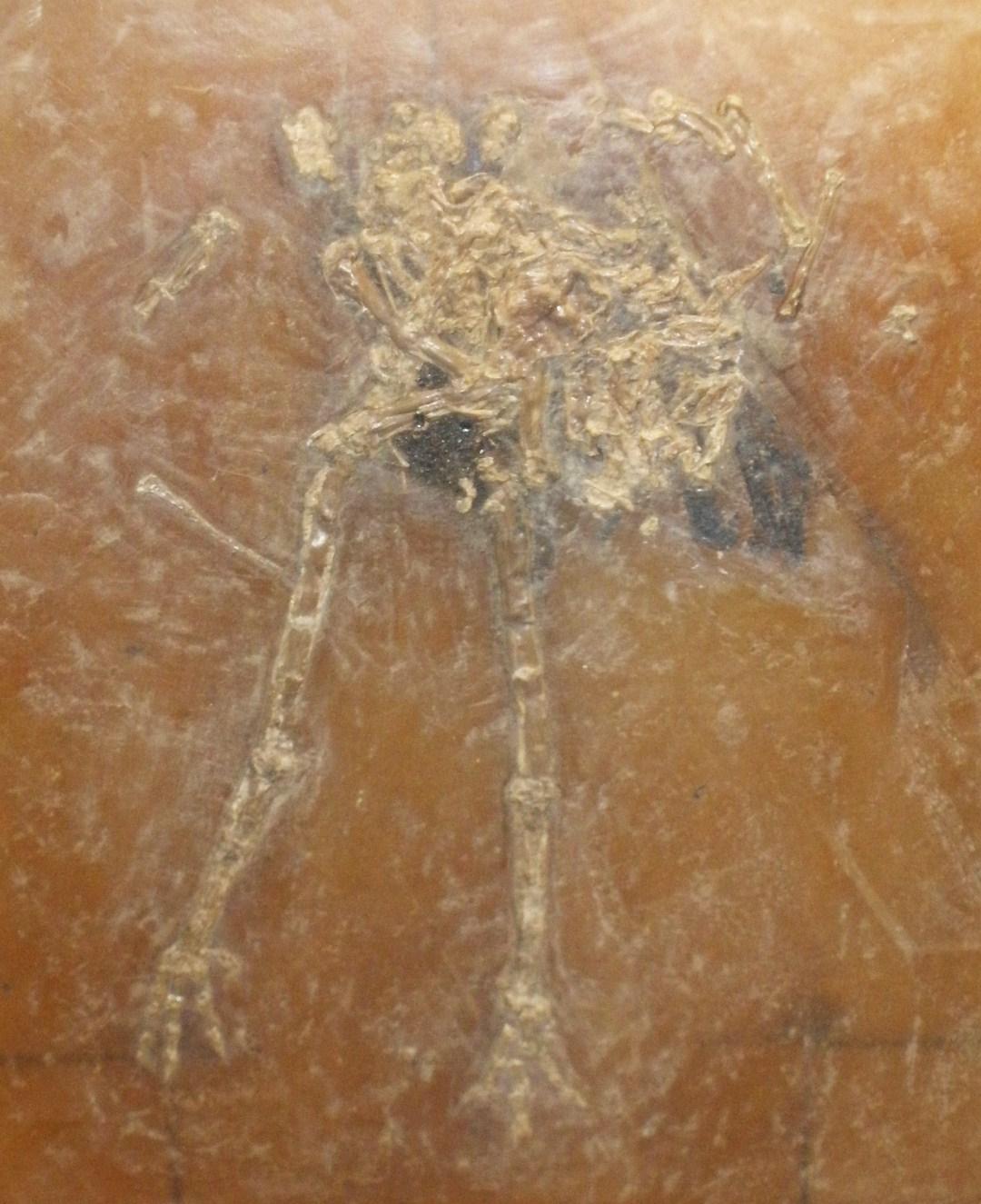

Scientific classification
- Kingdom: Animalia
- Phylum: Chordata
- Class: Aves
- Order: Cariamiformes
- Family: †Idiornithidae

Genera
- †Gypsornis †Idiornis †Oblitavis †Occitaniavis †Propelargus

= Idiornithidae =

Idionithidae

Extinct family of birds

Idiornithidae is an extinct family of Cariamiformes. Fossils of these birds were found mainly in the phosphorus layers of Quercy in south-western France. Other specimens have been found throughout Germany as well.

== Description ==
The Idiornithidae were medium-sized birds with slender, long legs. Several postcranial bones of the genera Gypsornis and Idiornis have been found, with only one species leaving behind an articulated skeleton with the skull intact. The limited fossil evidence suggested that Idiornithidae much resembled seriemas. They were, however, smaller, some of them the size of the average pheasant. Until recently, idiornithids were commonly regarded as a suborder of the Gruiformes, but they are now classified as Cariamiformes.
