= Lucas Kraglievich =

Argentine paleontologist (1886–1932)

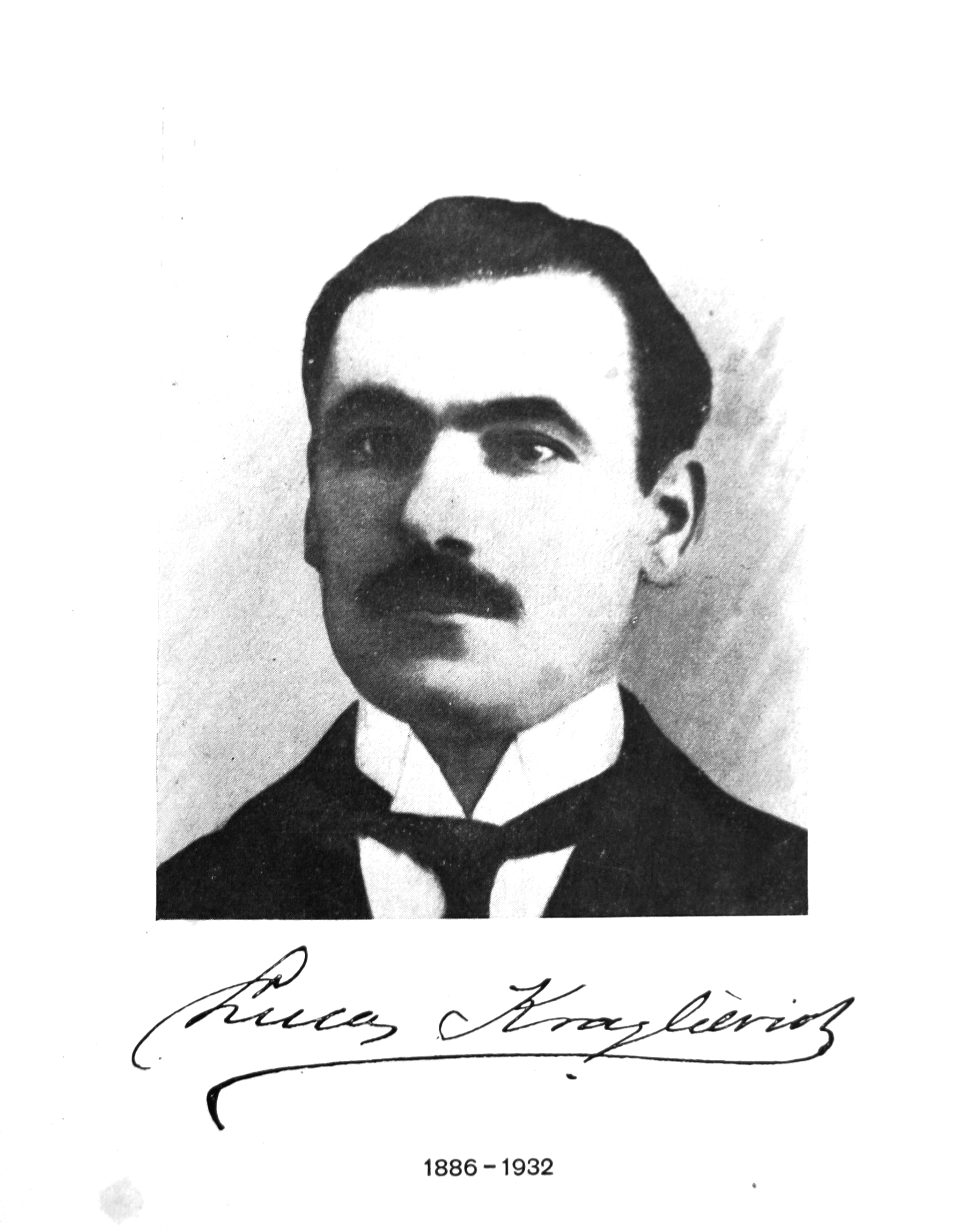
- Lucas Kraglievich (portrait and signature)
- Born: August 3, 1886; Balcarce, Buenos Aires Province, Argentina
- Died: March 13, 1932; Buenos Aires, Argentina
- Education: University of Buenos Aires
- Known for: Studies on fossil mammals and birds of the Paleogene, Neogene and Pleistocene of South America
- Awards: Premio Ladislao E. Holmberg (1927)
- Scientific career
- Fields: Paleontology, Vertebrate paleontology
- Workplaces: Museo Argentino de Ciencias Naturales Bernardino Rivadavia; Museo de La Plata; Museo Nacional de Historia Natural de Uruguay

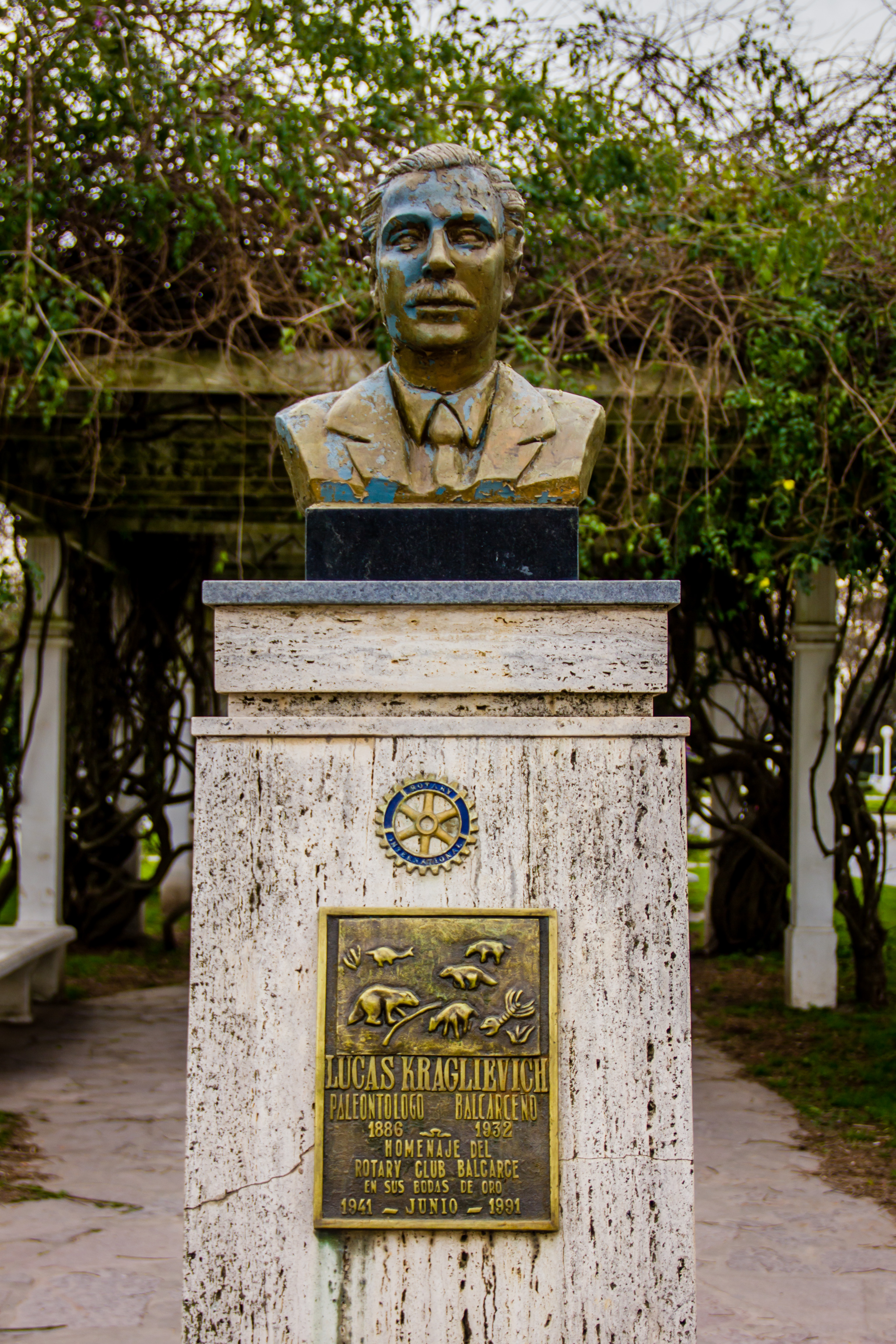
Monument to Lucas Kraglievich in Balcarce

Lucas Kraglievich (3 August 1886 – 13 March 1932) was an Argentine vertebrate paleontologist who specialized in the study of South American mammal faunas from the Paleogene, Neogene, and Pleistocene, both from a systematic and stratigraphic perspective.

== Biography ==
Kraglievich was born in 1886 on a ranch in the Balcarce district of Buenos Aires Province. At the insistence of his parents, he moved to Buenos Aires as a teenager, where he attended secondary school and later studied at the Faculty of Exact, Physical and Natural Sciences of the University of Buenos Aires. In the final year of his engineering studies, he discovered the work of Florentino Ameghino (1853–1911), a pioneer of vertebrate paleontology in Argentina, which inspired him to abandon engineering.

Together with fellow student Juan C. de Ortuzar, he organized a ten-month expedition between 1912 and 1913 for geological and paleontological research through Patagonia, exploring the Province of Chubut and the northern part of Santa Cruz Province. In 1914 he became an honorary collaborator at the Museo Argentino de Ciencias Naturales Bernardino Rivadavia in Buenos Aires, where he met researchers Carlos Ameghino and Eduardo Ladislao Holmberg. Meanwhile, he taught mathematics and natural sciences at several private secondary schools in Buenos Aires to support himself.

Kraglievich's early scientific work focused mainly on South American Xenarthra, later expanding to include rodents, bears, dogs, Astrapotheria, Toxodontidae, Typotheria, Hegetotheriidae, Macraucheniidae, Entelodontidae, and the fossil avifauna, including the giant predatory birds Phorusrhacos and Brontornis of the family Phorusrhacidae. He also described the terror birds Devincenzia pozzi and Andalgalornis steulleti.

In 1916, he published Las doctrinas de Ameghino. Sobre una titulada réplica, a treatise defending Ameghino's views on evolution and human origins. In 1918 he became a paid assistant, and in 1919 a technical assistant in the Paleontology Department. From 1919 to 1920 he worked with Carlos Ameghino and Enrique de Carles in the Geology and topography department of Buenos Aires Province, studying local geology and borehole samples.

In 1921, Kraglievich served as deputy director of the Museo Argentino de Ciencias Naturales. From 1925 to 1929, he headed the Paleontology Department, succeeding Carlos Ameghino. Between 1924 and 1925, he also worked at the La Plata Museum, reorganizing and cataloguing its fossil collections, assigning over 11,000 inventory numbers corresponding to individual specimens. Kraglievich served for two consecutive terms as president of the Sociedad Argentina de Ciencias Naturales.

Due to disagreements with museum director Martín Doello Jurado, he was forced to leave the Museo Argentino de Ciencias Naturales. In January 1931, he moved to Uruguay and briefly worked at the Museo Nacional de Historia Natural de Uruguay in Montevideo. During that time, he financed numerous fossil excavations and helped lay the foundations for the geological and paleontological study of the Uruguayan Tertiary and Quaternary.

Among his major contributions are the descriptions of 28 new fossil families and subfamilies, more than 80 genera and subgenera, and 250 species and subspecies of fossil mammals and birds. His bibliography includes over 100 monographs and articles published in Argentina and abroad, notably in Anales del Museo Nacional de Buenos Aires, Anales de la Sociedad Científica Argentina, Revista del Museo de La Plata, Physis, and El Hornero. His most significant works include Contribución al conocimiento de los grandes cánidos extinguidos de Sud-América (1928), Craneometría y clasificación de los cánidos sudamericanos... (1930), Los más grandes carpinchos actuales y fósiles... (1930), and the posthumous Manual de paleontología rioplatense: osteología comparada de los mamíferos (1937), completed with the help of his wife Francisca Kral and museum director Garibaldi J. Devincenzi despite his paralysis.

In 1940, the Buenos Aires provincial government published three volumes of Kraglievich's collected works.

He died in March 1932 after a long illness in Buenos Aires, and was buried in the Recoleta Cemetery. His son, Jorge Lucas Kraglievich (born 1928), also became a paleontologist.

== Honors ==
In 1927, the Academia Nacional de Ciencias Exactas, Físicas y Naturales of Buenos Aires awarded him the first "Premio Ladislao E. Holmberg" for his 1926 work Contribución a la paleontología argentina.

Several taxa have been named in his honor, including:

- Kraglievichia Castellanos, 1927
- Pseudorophodon kraglievichi Hoffstetter, 1954
- Platygonus kraglievichi Rusconi, 1930
- Ctenomys kraglievichi Rusconi, 1930
- Xenastrapotherium kraglievichi Cabrera, 1929
- Promacrauchenia kraglievichi Parodi, 1931
- Mesocapromys kraglievichi (Varona & Arredondo, 1979)
- Eopicure kraglievichi Frailey & Campbell, 2004

== Selected works ==
- Descripción de dos cráneos y otros restos del género "Pliomorphus" Amegh., procedentes de la formación Entrerriana... (1923)
- Los arctoterios norteamericanos (Tremarctotherium n. gen.), en relación con los de Sud América (1926)
- Los grandes roedores terciarios de la Argentina y sus relaciones... (1926)
- Contribución al conocimiento de los grandes cánidos extinguidos de Sud América (1928)
- Apuntes para la geología y paleontología de la República Oriental del Uruguay (1928)
- Diagnosis osteológico-dentaria de los géneros vivientes de la subfamilia "Caviinae" (1930)
- Craneometría y clasificación de los cánidos sudamericanos... (1930)
- La formación "friaseana" del río Frías... (1930)
- Los más grandes carpinchos actuales y fósiles de la subfamilia "Hydrochoerinae" (1930)
- Contribución al conocimiento de las aves fósiles de la época araucoentrerriana (1931)
