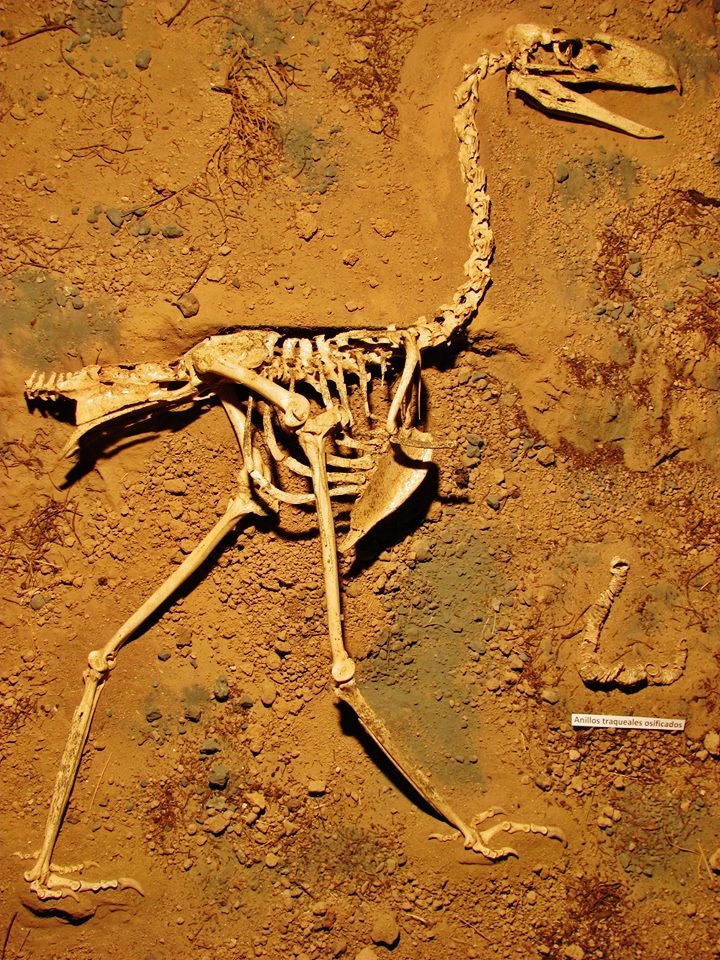
- Reconstructed skeleton

Scientific classification
- Kingdom: Animalia
- Phylum: Chordata
- Class: Aves
- Order: Cariamiformes
- Family: †Phorusrhacidae
- Genus: †Llallawavis; Degrange et al., 2015
- Species: †L. scagliai

Binomial name
- †Llallawavis scagliai Degrange et al., 2015

= Llallawavis =

Llallawavis Temporal range: Pliocene (Chapadmalalan) ~3.5 Ma

Extinct genus of birds

Llallawavis scagliai (magnificent bird of Scaglia) is a large, extinct predatory bird from Pliocene Argentina. Its fossil is the most complete fossil of a phorusrhacid (or "terror bird") yet found.

== Description ==
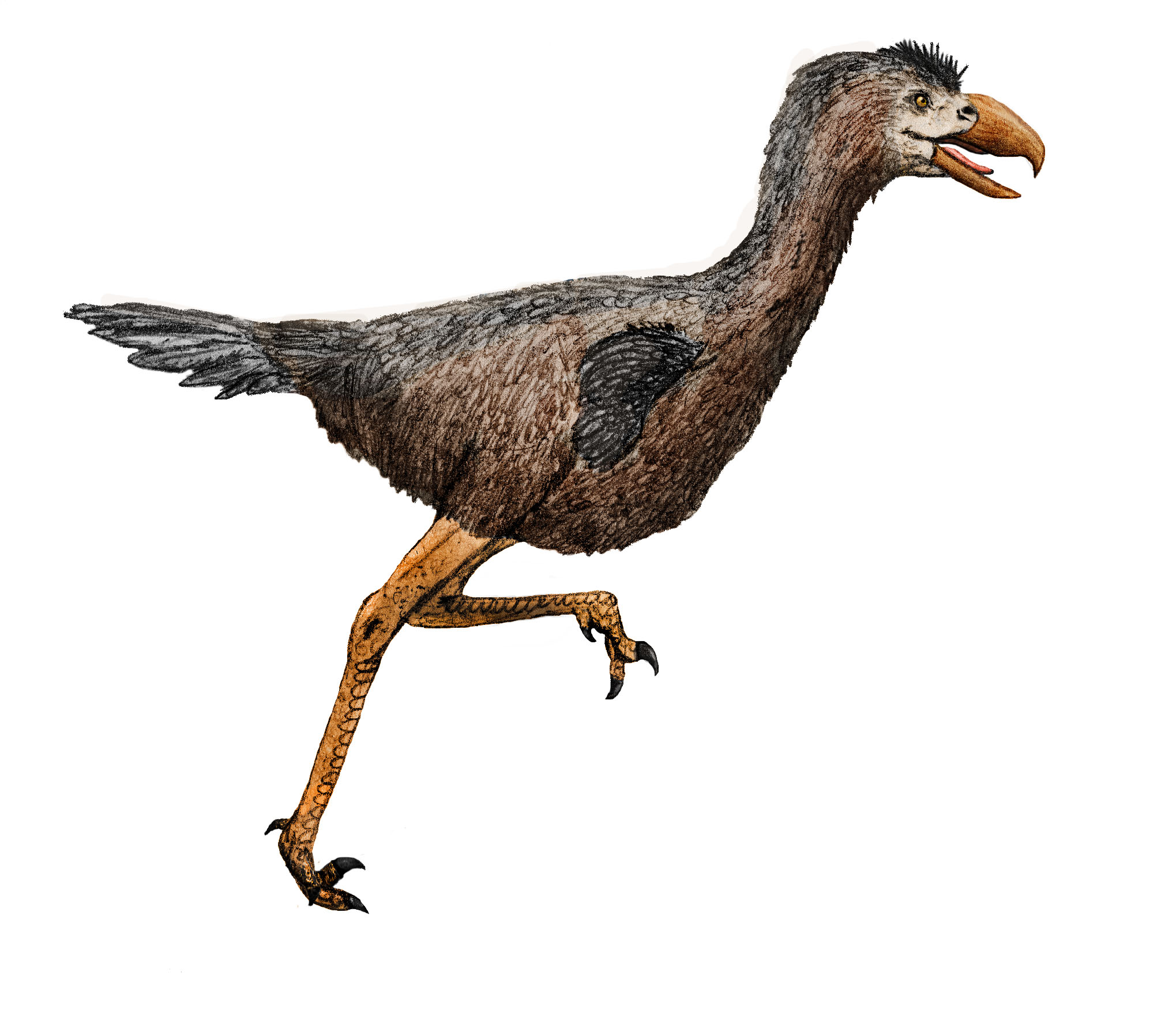
Restoration

The fossil, discovered in 2010 in sediment among the cliffs above La Estafeta beach in the lower part of the Playa Los Lobos Allo Formation of around 3.5 million years ago to the Late Pliocene. The terror bird is known from a nearly intact skeleton, including the complete palate, complete trachea, skull, voice box, and eye bones. L. scagliai was a medium-sized phorusrhacid around 1.2 metres (3.9 ft) tall and weighed around 18 kilograms (40 lb). lived in Argentina approximately 3.5 million years ago during the Pliocene.

== Paleobiology ==
Llallawavis scagliai likely roamed in grassland environments, much like the rest of its Mesembriornithine kin. CT scans of its inner ear show that it could only hear frequencies between about 380 and 4,230 hertz, with optimal hearing in the 2,300 Hz range. This also indicates that they may have produced deep vocalisations similar to those of other large terrestrial birds, such as bustards and cassowaries. These same CT scans also show that the inner ear of Llallawavis is fine tuned to sudden changes in movement, likely from quickly turning when trying to catch prey. Such adaptations are seen in other predators that hunt in open habitats that need to chase fast and agile prey.

This is corroborated by studies of a close relative of Llallawavis, the larger Mesembriornis, whose limb bones have been found to show various adaptations towards high-speed pursuit of prey, with estimates suggesting a top speed of 27 m/s (97 km/h; 60 mph), though somewhat slower speeds have been suggested as more plausible. Additionally, the limb bone's ability to withstand high stresses in addition to the presence of laterally compressed claws on the feet of most terror birds would suggest the usage of the limbs in prey capture as well. The joints separating the skulls bones were fused, unlike modern birds, and that may have helped it dispatch decently-large prey animals thanks to the more stress-resistant skull. The skull was likely employed especially once prey was knocked to the ground, with the terror bird pinning it with the use of its strong legs and recurved talons while tearing into prey animal with a powerful beak. Combined, this paints mesembriornithines such as Llallawavis as high-speed pursuit predators chasing small notoungulates across open plains in a manner similar to that of a cheetah, in contrast with their much larger, more robust phorusrhacines (ambush predators of more wooded areas that hunted the larger notoungulates, glyptodonts, and ground sloths).

== Phylogeny ==
The below cladogram is simplified after the analysis of Degrange et al. (2015).

- Cariamiformes
  - Cariamidae
  - Phorusrhacidae
    - - Mesembriornithinae
        - Mesembriornis incertus
        - - Mesembriornis milneedwardsi
          - - Llallawavis scagliai
            - Procariama simplex
      - Psilopterinae
        - - Psilopterus affinis
          - Psilopterus bachmanni
        - - Psilopterus colzecus
          - Psilopterus lemoinei
    - - Kelenken guillermoi
      - - Devincenzia pozzi
        - - Titanis walleri
          - - Paraphysornis brasiliensis
            - - Andrewsornis abbotti
              - Andalgalornis steulleti
              - Patagornis marshi
              - Phorusrhacos longissimus
              - Physornis fortis
