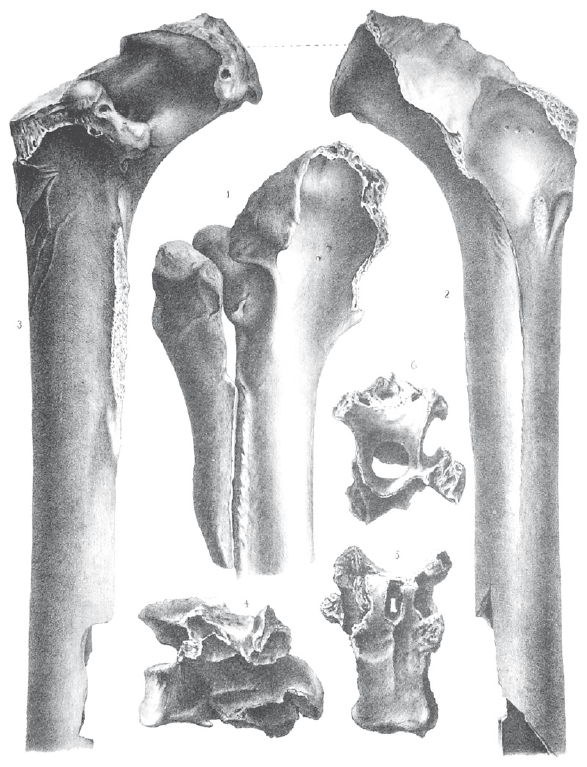
- Leg bones

Scientific classification
- Kingdom: Animalia
- Phylum: Chordata
- Class: Aves
- Order: Cariamiformes
- Family: †Phorusrhacidae
- Subfamily: †Mesembriornithinae
- Genus: †Mesembriornis; Moreno, 1889

Type species
- Mesembriornis milneedwardsi Moreno, 1889

Species
- M. milneedwardsi Moreno, 1889; M. incertus Rovereto, 1914

Synonyms
- Hermosiornis Rovereto, 1914; Palaeociconia australis Moreno, 1889; Prophororhacos

= Mesembriornis =

Mesembriornis Temporal range: Late Miocene-Early Pliocene (Montehermosan-Chapadmalalan) ~6.8–3.0 Ma

Extinct genus of birds

Mesembriornis is a genus of intermediate-sized phorusrhacids that grew up to 1.5 metres (4.9 ft) in height. They represent a well-distinct lineage of terror birds, differing from the massive large groups and the smaller Psilopterinae. In general proportions, they most resembled the Patagornithinae which flourished somewhat earlier, mainly to the south of the range of Mesembriornis. Fossils of the terror bird have been found in Montehermosan deposits of the Monte Hermoso Formation, as well as the Andalgala Formation and Chapadmalal Formation in Argentina.

== Taxonomy and discovery ==
Mesembriornis was first described by Argentine paleontologist Francisco Moreno during the "Argentine Bone Wars" between him and Florentino Ameghino in 1889 based on a cervical vertebral centrum along with the proximal section of a right tibiotarsus and fibula (MLP-140-142), the species name being Mesembriornis milneedwardsi. The genus name, Mesembriornis, means "southern bird" after its discovery in the southern Argentina, while the specific name is after French paleontologist Alphonse Milne-Edwards. In the same paper, Moreno erected a new genus and species of what he thought to be a fossil stork, Paleociconia australis, based on a distal left tarsometatarsus. This species has since been synonymized with Mesembriornis milneedwardsi, and Moreno also unknowingly assigned a femur of M. milneedwardsi to another one of his taxa, Driornis pampeanus. All of the fossils were collected from the Monte Hermoso Formation strata of the town of Monte Hermoso in Buenos Aires Province, Argentina. 2 years later in 1891, Moreno and his colleague Alcides Mercerart described two more Mesembriornis species that are now seen as synonymous with the large Phorusrhacid Phorusrhacos, the species being Mesembriornis studeri and Mesembriornis quatrefragesi, the former species' type specimen notably included skull and mandible material.

It wasn't until 1914 that additional fossils of Mesembriornis were described by Gaetano Rovereto, who believed that the genus name Mesembriornis was a nomen nudum and should be replaced by the genus name Hermosiornis, even creating the family Hermosiornidae for the genus and the two species he assigned to it, Mesembriornis milneedwardsi and Mesembriornis (Paleociconia) australis. Rovereto referred a nearly complete skeleton lacking the skull to M. milneedwardsi (MACN-5944) that may actually be from the same individual as the holotype (MLP-140-142). Rovereto also believed that "Hermosiornis" was the ancestor of the modern Cariama and the descendant of Psilopterus (Pelecyornis), though this has since been disproven. The only other valid species of Mesembriornis was described in the same paper as Prophororhacos incertus based on a dorsal vertebra, partial right hindlimb, and assorted postcranial elements found in the Upper Miocene to Lower Pliocene strata of the Andalgala Formation in Catamarca Province, Argentina. Several more fragmentary postcranial elements of an individual originally ascribed to Procariama also belong to Mesembriornis incertus. Skull material of Mesembriornis wasn't described until in 1946, Uruguayan paleontologist Lucas Kraglievich named another species of "Hermosiornis", Hermosiornis rapax, based on a nearly complete skeleton (MMP-S155) including a mandible and partial skull but missing parts of the limbs. The fossils described by Rovereto and Kraglievich were found in the Chapadmalal Formation, dating to the Chapadmalalan of the late Pliocene. Mesembriornis lived on the pampa of eastern Argentina, from the Late Miocene to the Late Pliocene, roughly 5.3 to 4 million years ago. Together with the North American giant Titanis walleri, it was among the last terror birds alive.

== Description ==
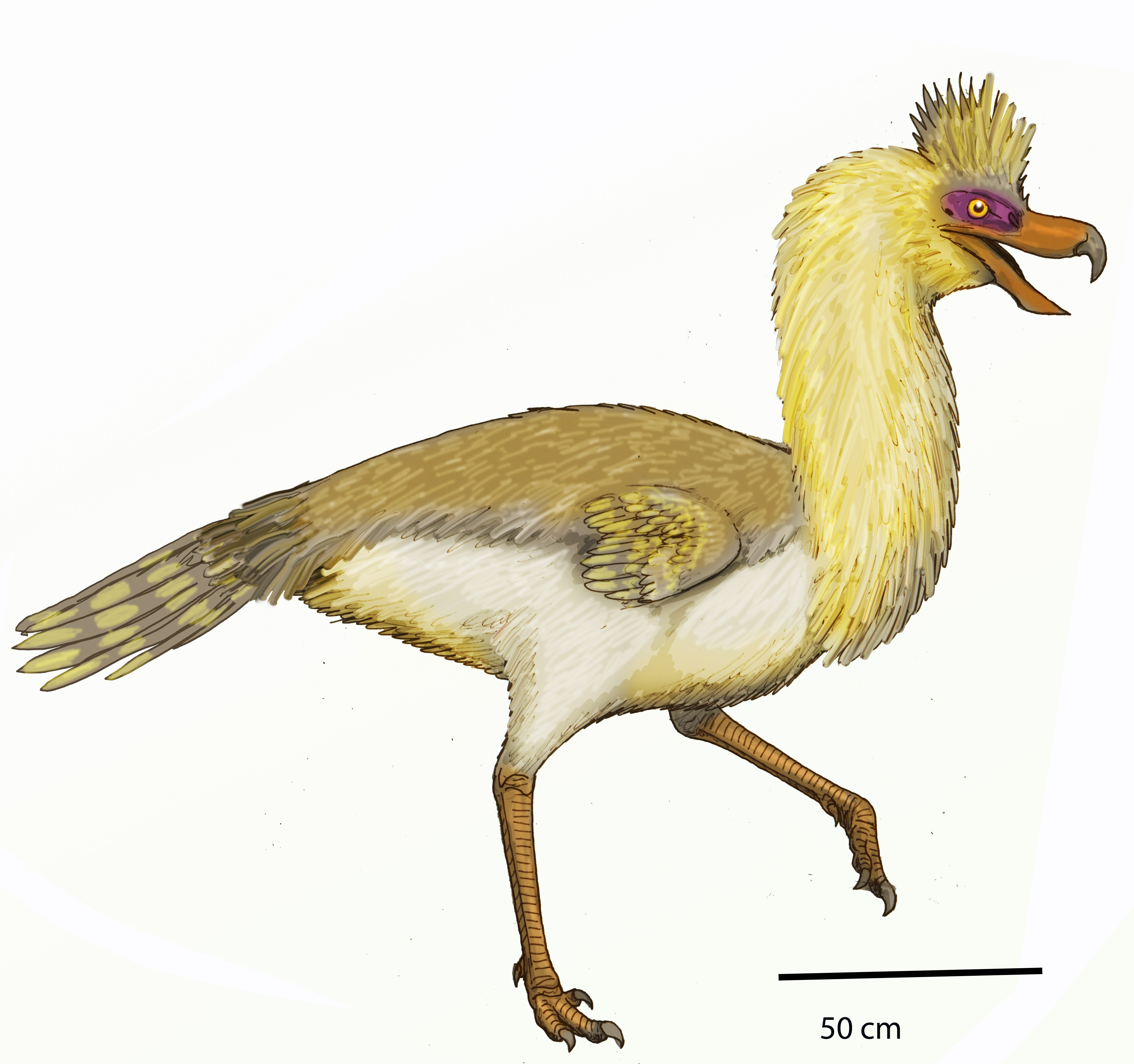
Life restoration of M. milneedwardsi

M. incertus looked very much like Patagornis and Andalgalornis in terms of construction (about 1.4 meters high). M. milneedwardsi, on the other hand, was at least 20% larger and heavier. The weight of this species is calculated at 70 kg and height of the back between 1.1 and 1.2 meters. When kept up, the head would be held at an altitude of almost 1.7 meters.

The upper maxilla bone is relatively low, especially in the middle, and rostral extended. The symphysis of the lower jaw (Symphysis mandibulae) is short and quite low. On the Tibiotarsus, the top of the Condylus Internus (lump) is pronounced and bent on the proximal side, so that a sharper angle is formed with the diaphysis. The genus is the lankiest of all the Phorusrhacids, where the Tarsometatarsus reaches a length of 80 to 85% of the length of the tibiotarsus. The middle trochlea is spread at the distal end, with a width equal to or larger than the smallest diameter of the diaphysis.

== Paleobiology ==
=== Mesembriornis habits ===
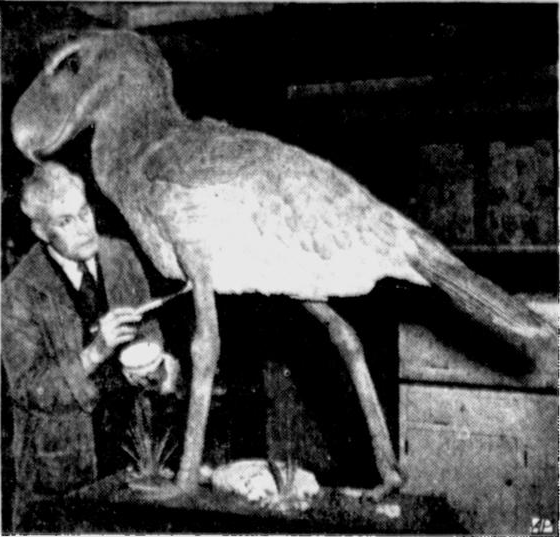
Model reconstruction

A study called "Terror Birds on the Run" measured how fast ancient terror birds could run in 2005. The study calculated the speeds of the phorusrhacids Patagornis, Mesembriornis, and a giant indeterminate phorusrhacine from the Quaternary of Uruguay. The paper found an estimate of 27 m/s (97 km/h), one of the highest speeds calculated for a terrestrial vertebrate, the speed being comparable to that of the modern spotted cheetah. This estimate is further supported by the strength of the preserved fossils, the width of the middle section of the tibial diaphysis being 3.2 cm. However, the authors of the paper pointed out that the estimate could be inflated and that the use of the limbs was instead for kicking prey. A speed as high as the one estimated could be very beneficial in the environment Mesembriornis lived in, as there was a large number of carnivorous mammals and birds like Borhyaena, Phorusrhacos, and Cladosictis. There are two main theories about how Mesembriornis hunted:

"Crushing Kicks"

Based on anatomical and ecological similarities to the modern secretary Bird, phorusrhacids may have used kicks to kill prey or defend kills. If it also attained the speed first thought as well as this kick, it could not have been forced off kills as easily as cheetahs in Africa. The kick also may have been used for self defense as based on modern ratites. Blanco et al.. (2005) also stated that the large, curved, and laterally compressed pedal ungues of Mesembriornis are similar to those in modern carnivorous birds.

"Cheetah of the Tertiary"

This school of thought suggests Mesmbriornis may have lived akin to a modern-day cheetah, eating the smaller notoungulate mammals of the time (Miocene) using its speed to outrun the beasts. Its top speed is a matter of debate, but estimates go up to 90 kilometres per hour (56 mph). Some other scientists scale down the predator's speed to 85, 80, 75 or even the average phorusrhacid speed of 70 km/h. High speed pursuit predation is potentially further supported by a close cousin Llallawavis, with CT scans of its inner ear showcasing adaptations to stabilizing the head when making quick movements. This would be concordant with a lifestyle of chasing nimble prey across the open pampas.

=== Diet and predation ===
Due to the uncertainty on the habits and paleobiology of Mesembriornis, much of the inferred ecology depends on the former. Following the "kicking" hypothesis, Mesembriornis was capable of delivering a kick with a force 3.5 times that of the body weight, a force capable of breaking the bones of modern medium-sized mammals like the springbok, Thomson's gazelle, and chamois. This also means that Mesembriornis and other phorusrhacids could've accessed the bone marrow inside bones, a behavior done in the extant bearded vulture which has been observed breaking bones by dropping them from high altitudes. This implies that Mesembriornis could've filled its own ecological role, akin to that of the extant bone-breaking hyena in Africa.

== Classification ==
The following phylogenetic tree shows the internal relationships of Phorusrhacidae under the exclusion of Brontornis as published by Degrange and colleagues in 2015, which recovers Mesembriornis as a member of a large clade that includes Procariama and Llallawavis.

- Cariamiformes
  - Cariamidae
  - Phorusrhacidae
    - - Mesembriornithinae
        - Mesembriornis incertus
        - - Mesembriornis milneedwardsi
          - - Llallawavis scagliai
            - Procariama simplex
      - Psilopterinae
        - - Psilopterus affinis
          - Psilopterus bachmanni
        - - Psilopterus colzecus
          - Psilopterus lemoinei
    - - Kelenken guillermoi
      - - Devincenzia pozzi
        - - Titanis walleri
          - - Paraphysornis brasiliensis
            - - Andrewsornis abbotti
              - Andalgalornis steulleti
              - Patagornis marshi
              - Phorusrhacos longissimus
              - Physornis fortis
