= Paleopsilopterus =

Paleopsilopterus Temporal range: Early Eocene (Itaboraian) ~53–50 Ma

Scientific classification
- Kingdom: Animalia
- Phylum: Chordata
- Class: Aves
- Order: Cariamiformes
- Family: †Phorusrhacidae
- Genus: †Paleopsilopterus
- Species: †P. itaboraiensis

Binomial name
- †Paleopsilopterus itaboraiensis Alvarenga, 1985

Extinct genus of birds

Paleopsilopterus is an extinct genus of large, flightless, predatory birds classified within the order Cariamiformes. It is generally placed in the subfamily Psilopterinae of the family Phorusrhacidae, commonly known as "terror birds," although its precise taxonomic placement has been subject to debate.

Paleopsilopterus lived during the Early Eocene (approximately 53 to 50 million years ago), specifically within the Itaboraian South American Land Mammal Age. Fossils of the only known species, Paleopsilopterus itaboraiensis, have been discovered in the Itaboraí Formation near São José de Itaborai in the state of Rio de Janeiro, Brazil.
