= Herculano Alvarenga =

Brazilian doctor and paleontologist

- Born: Herculano Marcos Ferraz de Alvarenga; November 7, 1947 (age 78); Taubaté, Brazil
- Education: Universidade de Taubaté
- Scientific career
- Fields: Paleontology, Medicine
- Workplaces: Taubaté Natural History Museum
- Doctoral advisor: Elizabeth Hofling
- Author abbrev. (zoology): Alvarenga

Herculano Marcos Ferraz de Alvarenga (born 7 November 1947) is a Brazilian ornithologist, paleontologist and physician, founder of the Taubaté Natural History Museum.

== Life ==
Herculano Alvarenga was born in 1947 in Taubaté, São Paulo, Brazil. As a teenager, he started to watch birds and collect them. He went to São Paulo when he was 15 to study taxidermy and soon his stuffed specimens started to be exhibited in scientific expositions in high school.

His interests in biology and anatomy led him to study medicine, specializing in orthopedy. In 1975 he returned to Taubaté and became professor of the Faculty of Medicine in the city. When the faculty went on strike in 1977, he started to look for fossils, which led him to discover the first fossil of Paraphysornis brasiliensis.

After the description of Paraphysornis brasiliensis was published in 1982, the fossil gained high notoriety in the scientific community. Many museums worldwide asked for replicas of the fossil, trading it for replicas of other famous fossils. Soon Alvarenga had a rich collection of replicas and some actual fossils, as well as several stuffed animals. As a result, he founded in 2000 the Fundação de Apoio à Ciência e Natureza (Foundation for the Support of Science and Nature), which led to the opening of the Taubaté Natural History Museum in 2004. Currently, Alvarenga is the leading paleornithologist in Brazil, having described various fossil species, including taxa from the Paleocene (Itaboraí, Rio de Janeiro) such as Diogenornis and Paleopsilopterus, Oligocene/Miocene (Taubaté basin, São Paulo) such as Paraphysornis and Hoazinavis, and Pleistocene (Bahia and Minas Gerais), such as Pleistovultur and Wingegyps, in collaboration with a number of scientists.
