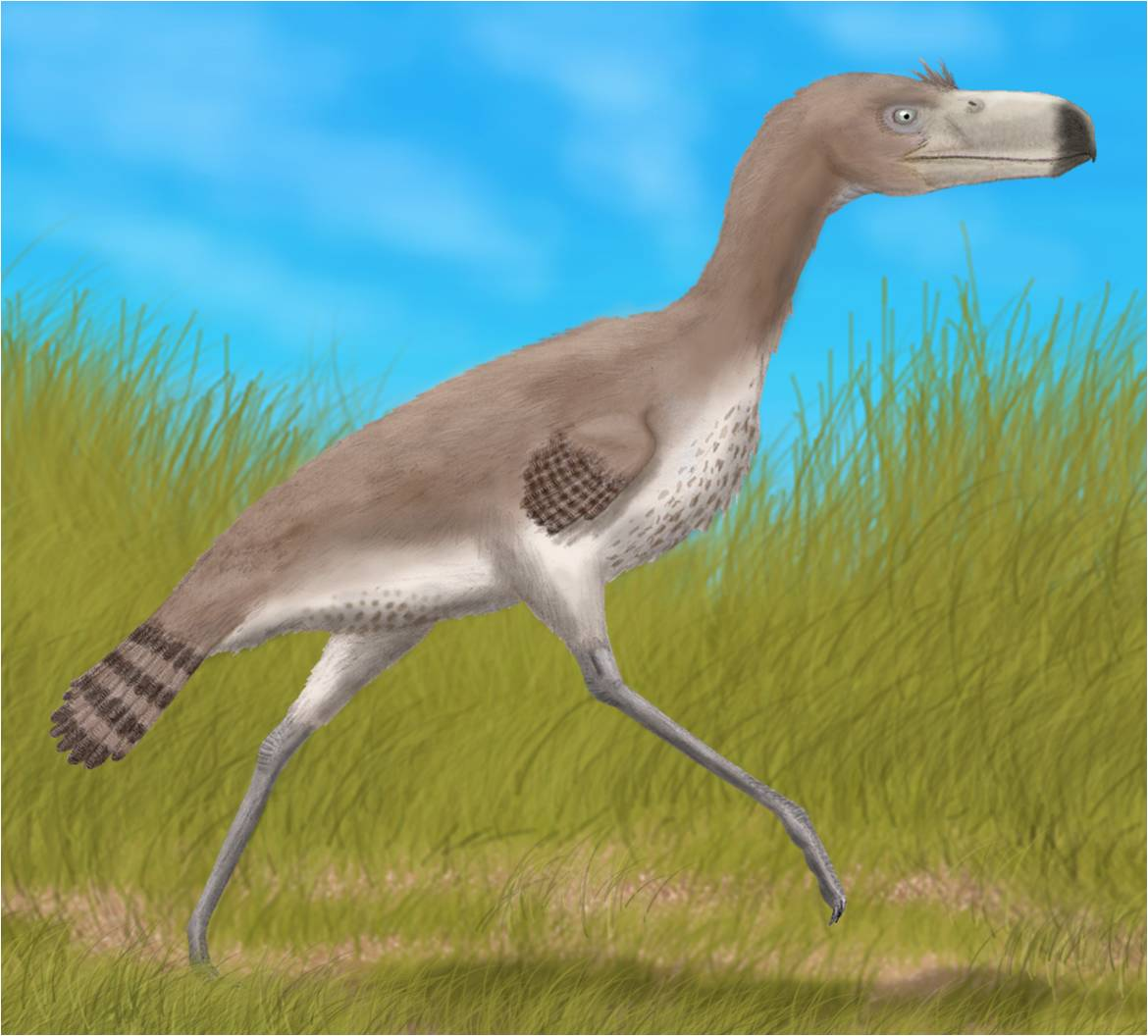

Scientific classification
- Kingdom: Animalia
- Phylum: Chordata
- Class: Aves
- Order: Cariamiformes
- Family: †Phorusrhacidae
- Subfamily: †Psilopterinae
- Genus: †Procariama; Rovereto, 1914
- Species: †P. simplex

Binomial name
- †Procariama simplex Rovereto, 1914

= Procariama =

Procariama Temporal range: Late Miocene-Early Pliocene (Huayquerian-Montehermosan) 6.8–4 Ma

Extinct genus of birds

Procariama is an extinct monotypic genus of phorusrhacid, which lived from the Late Miocene to the Late Pliocene (11-2 million years ago) of Argentina. Fossils of the animal have been found in six places, in the Cerro Azul and Andalhuala Formations. More specifically in the Andagalá department and in the north of the Belén department of the Catamarca province, with a single location in the La Pampa province. The type and only species, Procariama simplex, is the largest member of the subfamily Psilopterinae.

== History of Discovery ==
The lectotype of Procariama (MACN-8225) is a partial skeleton consisting of an incomplete skull, a pelvis, proximal and distal parts of the left femur, distal parts of the right tibiotarsus, proximal and distal parts of the right tarsometatarsus, foot bones and the nail bearing toe bones of the nearly complete left foot, and fragments of the toe bones of the right foot. The genus name was first published in 1914 by Cayetano Rovereto in Anales del Museo Nacional de Historia Natural.

== Description ==
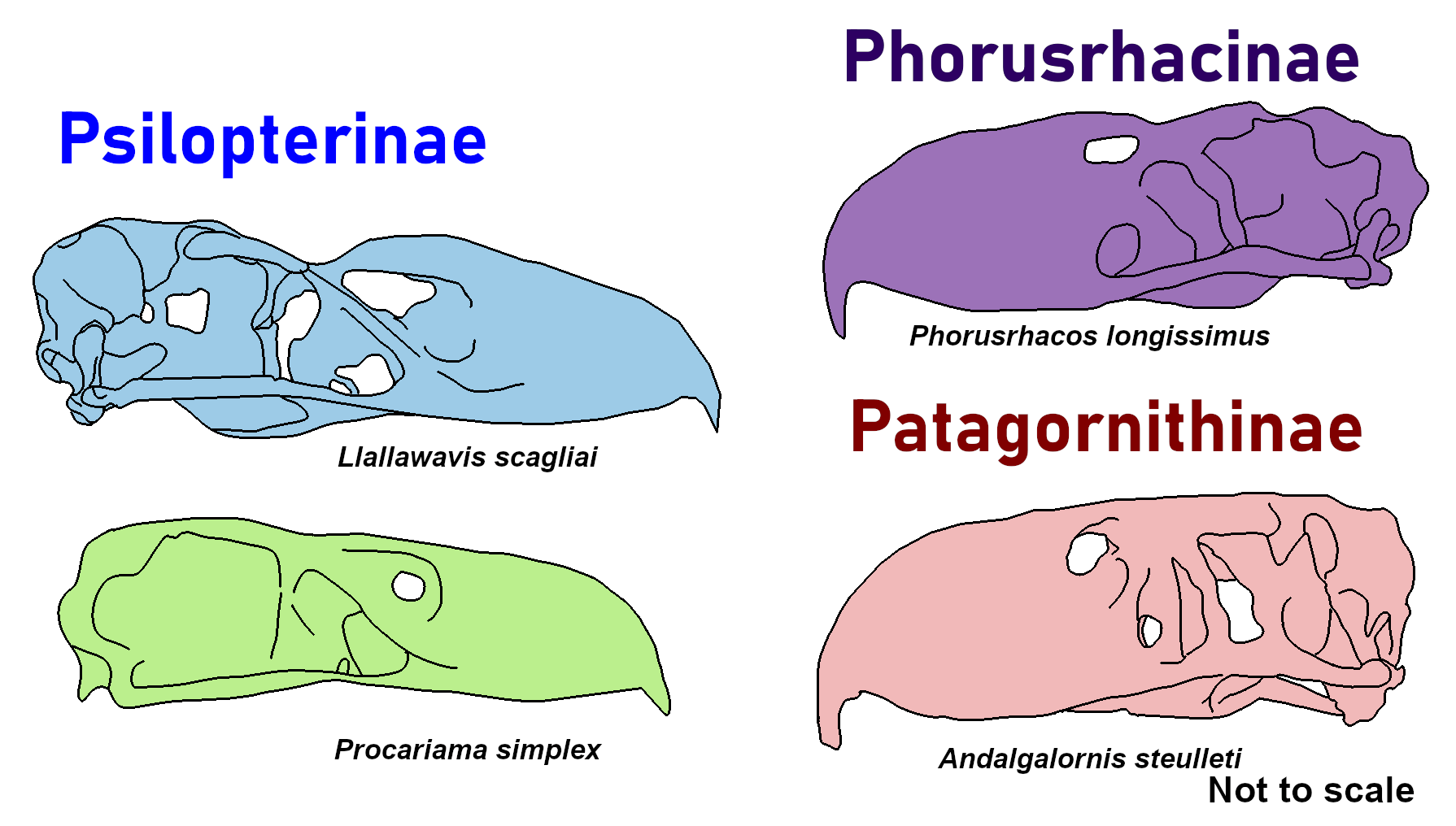
The skull of Procariama (bottom left) compared to 3 other Phorusrhacids.

Reaching about 70 centimetres (2.3 ft) in height and 10 kilograms (22 lb) in body mass, Procariama was one of the smaller phorusrhacids. However, it was larger than Psilopterus, Paleopsilopterus, and other members of the subfamily Psilopterinae.

Procariama is quite similar to Psilopterus, but differs from this genus in both size and a more robust build. This more robust build can be attributed to a slight difference in the ratio between the bones of the legs, with the thigh being comparatively shorter in Procariama. Next to this, the wing bones of Procariama are also proportionally smaller than those of Psilopterus. In the tarsometatarsus, the hypotarsus has two protrusions, one laterally and one medially, in its most proximal portion. These protrusions look like two crests, which is different from the condition in both Psilopterus and Paleopsilopterus.

The genus is very similar to Mesembriornis and lived during the same geological period, making fossils of the two easily confused. This happened, for example, in the original publication by Rovereto.

The genus name of the animal means "before Cariama", referring to the genus Cariama, the red-legged seriema, which is a genus of small, carnivorous bird native to South America. It is also the closest living relative of the Phorusrhachids.

=== Known material ===
Three specimens of Procariama are known in addition to the lectotype. Firstly, there's MACN-6939, consisting of a femur missing its distal end, the distal part of the left tarsometatarsus and a few pedal phalanges. Secondly we have FM-P 14525, an exquisitely preserved and nearly complete skeleton.

== Classification ==
Like all phorusrhacids, Procariama is part of the order Cariamiformes, the only modern representatives of which are the seriemas. Procariama is traditionally placed in the subfamily Psilopterinae, but in the description of Llallawavis scagliai, it is placed in the subfamily Mesembriornithinae as a sister taxon of Llallawavis. In 2024, it was reclassified as a member of the Psilopterinae.

- Phorusrhacidae
  - - Mesembriornithinae
      - Mesembriornis incertus
      - - Mesembriornis milneedwardsi
        - - Llallawavis
          - Procariama
    - Psilopterinae
  - Other phorusrhacids
