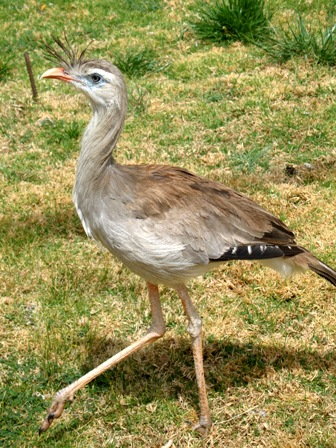
- Red-legged seriema, Cariama cristata (Cariamidae)
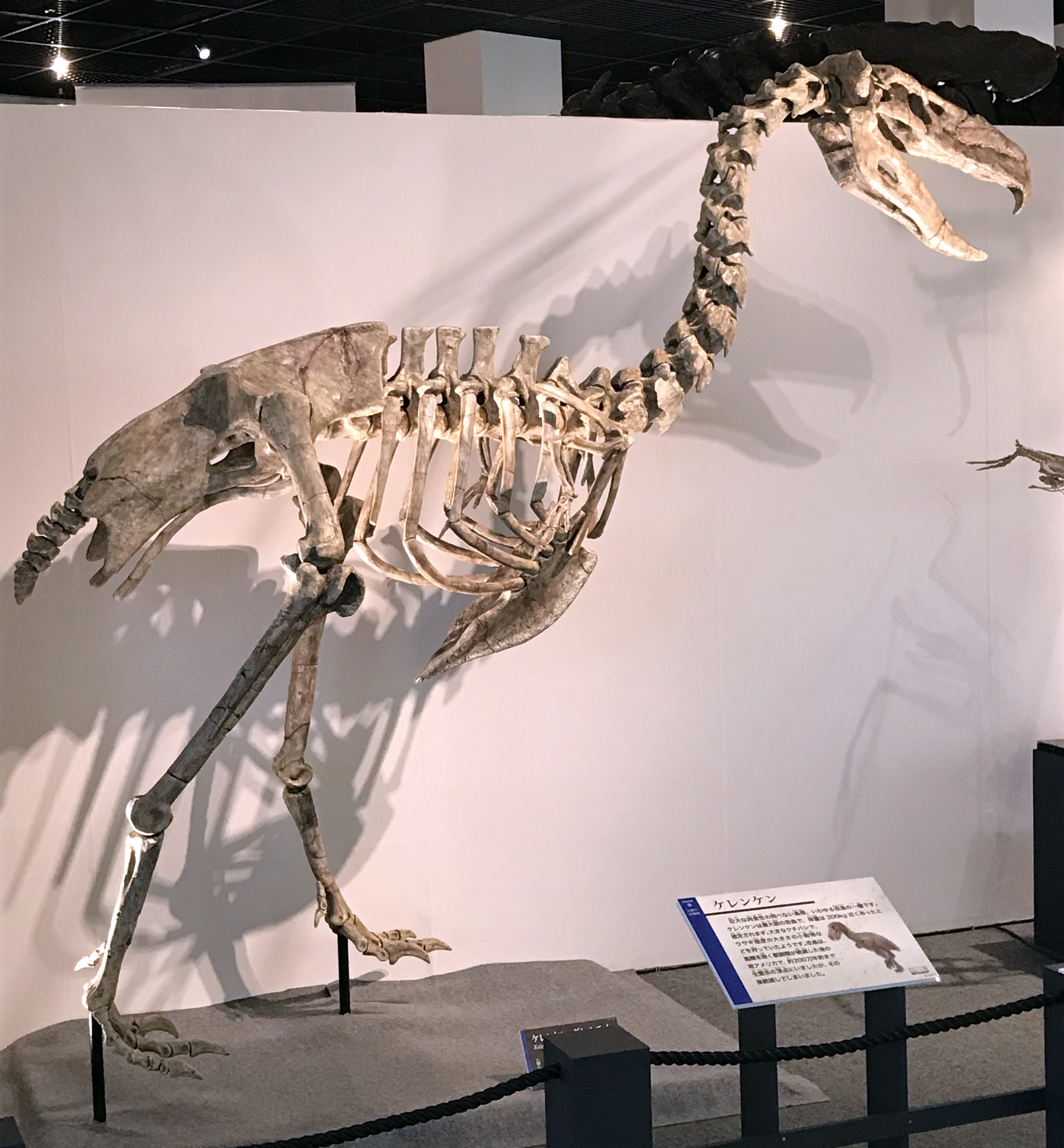
- Kelenken (Phorusrhacidae)

Scientific classification
- Kingdom: Animalia
- Phylum: Chordata
- Class: Aves
- Clade: Australaves
- Order: Cariamiformes; Fürbringer, 1888

Families
- Cariamidae (seriemas); †Ameghinornithidae; †Bathornithidae; †Eleutherornithidae; †Idiornithidae; †Phorusrhacidae (terror birds); †Salmilidae

= Cariamiformes =

Cariamiformes Temporal range: Early Eocene–present Suspected, but still not confirmed, late Cretaceous origin by molecular clock

Order of birds

Cariamiformes (or Cariamae) is an order of primarily flightless birds that has existed for over 50 million years. The group includes the family Cariamidae (seriemas) and the extinct families such as Phorusrhacidae, Bathornithidae, Idiornithidae, and Ameghinornithidae. Extant members (seriemas) are only known from South America, but fossils of many extinct taxa are also found in other continents including Europe and North America. Though traditionally considered a suborder within Gruiformes, both morphological and genetic studies show that it belongs to a separate group of birds, Australaves, whose other living members are Falconidae, Psittaciformes, and Passeriformes.

This proposal has been confirmed by molecular phylogenetics. The Cariamiformes are sister to the remaining extant Australaves. Falcons are then sister to the remaining Australaves, the parrots and Passeriformes. In combination with the fact that the Hieraves, which are sister to all other Afroaves lineages, are also predatory, it is inferred that the common ancestor of 'core landbirds' (Telluraves) was an apex predator. However, some researchers like Darren Naish feel that this assessment is biased towards the more well known, predatory representatives of the clade, and indeed at least one form, Strigogyps, appears to have been herbivorous.

The earliest known unambiguous member of this group is the early Eocene taxon Paleopsilopterus itaboraiensis. An isolated femur from the Cape Lamb Member of the López de Bertodano Formation, Vega Island, Antarctica was briefly described as a cariamiform femur in 2006. This specimen, which dates to the late Cretaceous period 66 million years ago, was originally reported as indistinguishable from the femurs of modern seriemas, and belonging to a large bird about 1 metre (3.3 ft) tall. Because of its age and geographic location, it was argued that this unnamed species may have been close to the ancestry of both cariamids and phorusrhacids. However, a subsequent study published by West et al. (2019) reinterpreted this specimen as a fossil of an unnamed large-bodied member of a non-cariamiform genus Vegavis. In 2024, two ungual phalanx specimens from the early Eocene strata in Antarctica have been identified as those of a cariamiform, possibly of a phorusrhacid.

Molecular phylogenetic studies have shown that Cariamiformes is sister to the Falconiformes, Psittaciformes and Passeriformes:

- Australaves
  - - Cariamiformes (seriemas and relatives)
    - - Falconiformes (falcons)
      - - Psittaciformes (parrots)
        - Passeriformes (songbirds)

== Summary of extant species ==
The IOC World Bird List (version 15.1) recognizes 2 species of Cariamiformes. As of December 2025, IUCN/BirdLife International has assessed both species within the order, but neither have population estimates.

Common name	Binomial name	Population	Status	Trend	Notes	Image
Red-legged seriema	Cariama cristata	unknown	LC	Steady		
Black-legged seriema	Chunga burmeisteri	unknown	LC	Steady		
