= Santacrucian =

South American land mammal age (SALMA)

The Santacrucian age is a period of geologic time (17.5 – 16.3 Ma) within the Early Miocene epoch of the Neogene, used more specifically with SALMA classification in South America. It follows the Colhuehuapian and precedes the Friasian age.

== Etymology ==
The age is named after the Santa Cruz Formation in the Austral/Magallanes Basin of southern Patagonia, Argentina and Chile.

== Formations ==
Locations of Santacrucian formations

Formation bold is type	Country	Basin	Notes
Santa Cruz Formation	Argentina; Chile	Austral Basin	
Aisol Formation	Argentina	San Rafael Block	
Cantaure Formation	Venezuela	Falcón Basin	
Castillo Formation	Venezuela	Falcón Basin	
Cerro Boleadoras Formation	Argentina	Austral Basin	
Chaguaramas Formation	Venezuela	Eastern Venezuela Basin	
Chilcatay Formation	Peru	Pisco Basin	
Chucal Formation - Chucal fauna	Chile	Altiplano Basin	
Cura-Mallín Group	Chile	Cura-Mallín Basin	
Gran Bajo del Gualicho Formation	Argentina	Colorado Basin	
Jimol Formation	Colombia	Cocinetas Basin	
Mariño Formation	Argentina	Cuyo Basin	
Pinturas Formation	Argentina	Austral Basin	
Río Yuca Formation	Venezuela	Barinas-Apure Basin	

== Fossils ==
Group	Fossils	Formation	Notes
Mammals	Abderites meridionalis, Acarechimys pascuali, Acaremys major, A. messor, A. murinus, A. tricarinatus, Acdestis lemairei, A. oweni, Acrocyon sectorius, Acyon bardus, A. tricuspidatus, Adianthus bucatus, Adiastaltus habilis, A. procerus, Adinotherium ferum, A. ovinum, A. robustum, Ameghinomys constans, A. rarus, Anatherium defossus, Anathitus revelator, Arctodictis munizi, Argyromanis patagonicus, cf. Asterostemma depressa, Astrapotherium magnum, Borhyaena tuberata, Cladosictis patagonica, Cochlops muricatus, Diadiaphorus majusculus, D. robustus, Dicardia fissa, Encinepeltus petesatus, Eocardia montana, Eucholoeops fronto, E. ingens, Euphractus patagonicus, Eutatus carinatus, E. deleo, E. lagena, Hapalops angustipalatus, H. elongatus, H. indifferens, H. longiceps, H. platycephalus, H. ponderosus, Hegetotherium mirabile, Homalodotherium cunninghami, Homunculus patagonicus, Interatherium excavatum, I. extensum, I. robustum, Licaphrium floweri, Lycopsis torresi, Metopotoxus laevatus, Microbiotherium acicula, M. gallegosense, M. patagonicum, M. tehuelchum, Necrolestes patagonensis, Neoreomys australis, Nesodon imbricatus, N. marmoratus, Orthoarthrus mixtus, Pachyrukhos moyani, Palaeothentes aratae, P. intermedius, P. minutus, P. lemoinei, P. pascuali, Paraeutatus distans, Pelecyodon cristatus, Peltephilus ferox, P. giganteus, P. nanus, P. pumilus, P. strepens, Perathereutes pungens, Phanomys mixtus, P. vetulus, Phonocdromus gracilis, Plagiocoelus obliquus, Planops magnus, Prepotherium filholi, P. potens, Proeutatus oenophorum, P. robustus, Propalaehoplophorus australis, P. incisivus, P. minus, Protamandua rothi, Prothylacinus patagonicus, Protypotherium attenuatum, P. australe, P. praerutilum, Prozaedyus exilis, Prozaedius proximus, Pseudoacaremys kramarzi, Pseudonotictis pusillus, Schismotherium rectangularis, Sipalocyon gracilis, S. obusta, Spaniomys modestus, Stegotherium tauberi, S. tesselatum, Steiromys detentus, S. duplicatus, Stenotatus hesternus, Stilotherium dissimile, Tetramerorhinus cingulatum, T. fortis, T. lucarius, T. mixtum, Theosodon garrettorum, T. gracilis, T. lydekkeri, Thoatherium minusculum, Vetelia puncta, Hyperleptus sp., Nematherium sp., Neuryurini sp., Perimys sp., Sciamys sp., Myrmecophagidae indet.	Santa Cruz	
Mammals	cf. Astrapotherium sp., cf. Theosodon sp., Lomaphorini indet., Mylodontinae indet., Propalaehoplophorinae indet., Toxodontidae indet.	Aisol	
Mammals	Baraguatherium takumara	Castillo	
Mammals	Xenastrapotherium christi, Boreostemma sp.	Chaguaramas	
Mammals	Altitypotherium chucalensis, A. paucidens, Eotypotherium chico, Hegetotherium cf. mirabile, Nesodon imbricatus, Parapropalaehoplophorus septentrionalis, Acarechimys sp., Adinotherium sp., Neoreomys sp., cf. Peltephilus sp., Stenotatus sp., Theosodon sp., Octodontoidea indet., Toxodontidae indet.	Chucal	
Mammals	Paedotherium minor, Acarechimys sp., aff. Alloiomys sp., ?Hegetotherium sp., aff. Incamys sp., Luantus sp., Maruchito sp., Prostichomys sp., Protacaremys sp., cf. Protypotherium sp., Sipalocyon sp., Abderitidae indet., Astrapotheria indet., Astrapotheriidae indet., Caviomorpha indet., Dasypodidae indet., Eocardiidae indet., Hegetotheriinae indet., Interatheriinae indet., Pachyrukhinae indet., Toxodontidae indet., Typotheria indet.	Cura-Mallín	
Mammals	Prohegetotherium schiaffinoi, Rusconitherium mendocense,Thoatheriopsis mendocensis, Scleromys sp.	Mariño	
Mammals	Acarechimys minutissimus, Acaremys murinus, Acdestis oweni, Adelphomys candidus, Branisamyopsis praesigmoides, Carlocebus carmenensis, C. intermedius, ?Diadiaphorus caniadensis, Eosteiromys annectens, E. cf. homogenidens, Galileomys eurygnathus, Luantus toldensis, L. propheticus, Microbiotherium cf. gallegosense, M. tehuelchum, Neoreomys australis, N. pinturensis, Oligobiotherium divisum, Pachybiotherium illuminatum, Perimys erutus, P. intermedius, Phanomys mixtus, Picturotherium migueli, Prostichomys bowni, Prothoatherium lacerum, Scleromys osbornianus, S. quadrangulatus, Soriacebus adrianae, S. ameghinorum, Spaniomys modestus, Steiromys principalis, S. duplicatus, Tetramerorhinus ?cingulatum, T. fleaglei, T. prosistens, Prolagostomus sp., Stichomys sp., Theosodon sp.	Pinturas	
Birds	Anisolornis excavatus, Badiostes patagonicus, Brontornis burmeisteri, Cariama santacrucensis, Eoneornis australis, Eutelornis patagonicus, Liptornis hesternus, Opisthodactylus patagonicus, Paraptenodytes antarcticus, Patagornis marshi, Phorusrhacos longissimus, Protibis cnemialis, Psilopterus bachmanni, P. lemoinei, Thegornis debilis	Santa Cruz	
Birds	Psilopteridae indet.	Aisol	
Reptiles & amphibians	Diasemosaurus occidentalis, Dibolosodon typicus, Erichosaurus bombimaxila, E. debilis, E. diminutus, Calyptocephalella sp., Colubridae indet.	Santa Cruz	
Reptiles & amphibians	Crocodylia indet.	Aisol	
Reptiles & amphibians	Anura indet.	Chucal	
Reptiles & amphibians	Crocodylidae indet., Gavialidae indet.	Jimol	
Reptiles & amphibians	Colubridae indet.	Pinturas	
Fishes	Carcharhinidae indet., Dalatiidae indet., Hemigaleidae indet., Lamnidae indet., Myliobatidae indet.	Jimol	
Flora	Araucaria marensii, Doroteoxylon vicentiperezii, Eucryphiaceoxylon eucryphioides, Myrceugenia chubutense, Nothofagoxylon triseriatum, Ulminium atlanticum	Santa Cruz	
