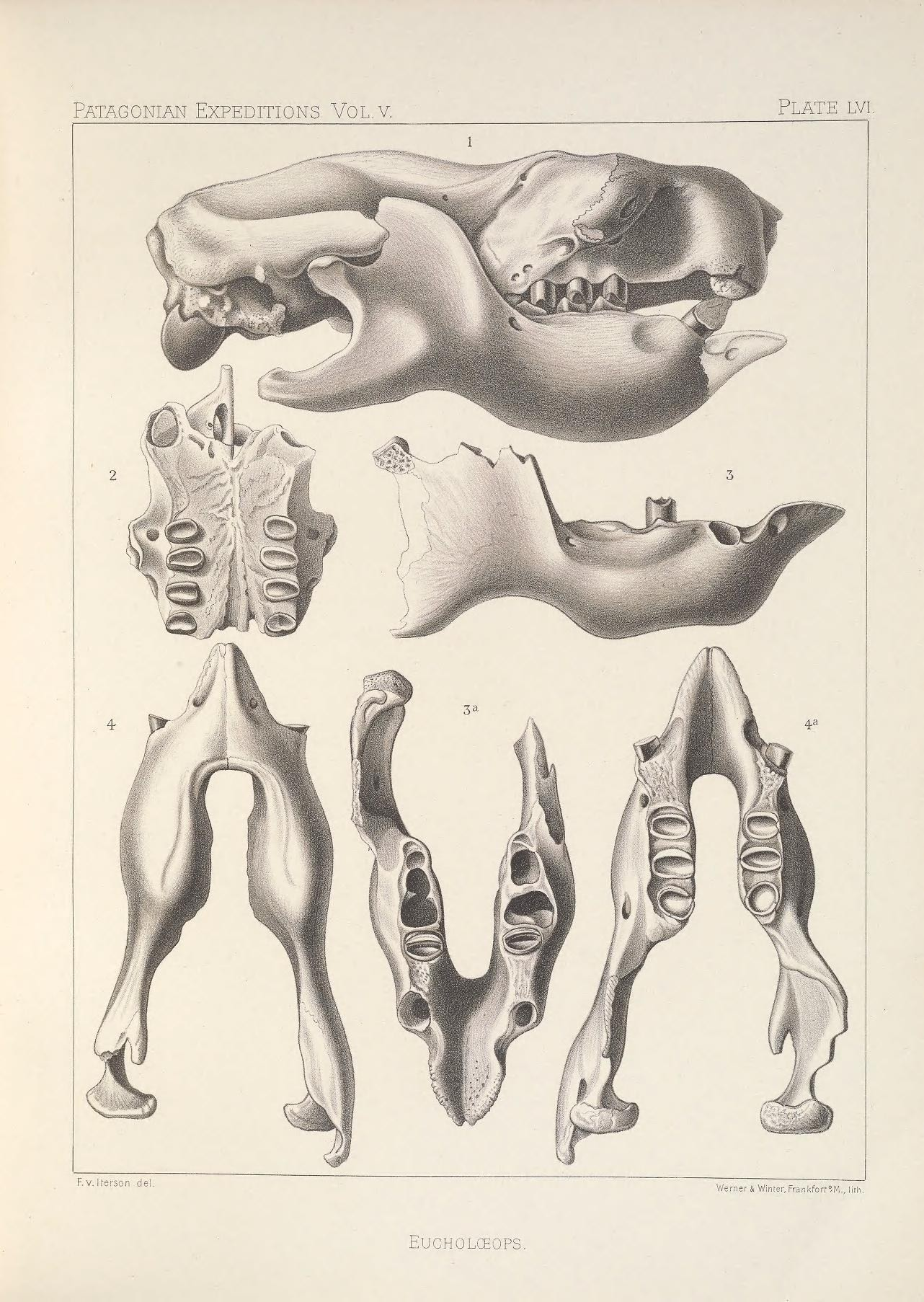
- Skull and jaw elements of Eucholoeops ingens

Scientific classification
- Kingdom: Animalia
- Phylum: Chordata
- Class: Mammalia
- Order: Pilosa
- Suborder: Folivora
- Family: †Megalonychidae
- Genus: †Eucholoeops; Ameghino, 1887

Type species
- †Eucholoeops ingens Ameghino, 1887

Synonyms
- Synonyms of E. ingens: †E. externus Ameghino, 1891; †E. fissognathus Ameghino, 1891; †E. fronto Ameghino, 1891; †E. lafonei Mercerat, 1891; †E. latifrons Mercerat, 1891; †E. latirostris Ameghino, 1891; †E. litoralis Ameghino, 1891; †E. curtus Ameghino, 1894

= Eucholoeops =

Eucholoeops Temporal range: Early Miocene Santacrucian ~17.4 Ma

Extinct genus of sloth

Eucholoeops (sometimes incorrectly spelled Eucholaeops) is a genus of megalonychid ground sloth that lived in southernmost Argentina. Fossils have been recovered from the lower Santa Cruz Formation of Patagonia, which has been dated to the Early Miocene. The type species, E. ingens, was named by Florentino Ameghino in 1887 based on skull fossils, encased in geological matrix, from the collection of his brother. These remains were never removed from the matrix, and have since been lost. Florentino Ameghino went on to name five more species if Eucholoeops, and another palaeontologist, Aldice Mercerat, named two more. All are now believed to represent the same taxon as E. ingens, and the lost type specimen has been replaced with a neotype lower jaw.

Though fairly small compared to the giant ground sloths of the Pliocene and Pleistocene, Eucholoeops was larger than any modern species, and with an estimated body mass of 80 kg (180 lb). In many ways it resembles Hapalops, to the point where the two genera were briefly regarded as one and the same. It is distinguished by its broad muzzle, very deep mandible, and the shape of its upper molariforms (teeth comparable to the molars of other mammals), among other characteristics. The caniniforms, teeth resembling the canines of other mammal groups, jutted forward in Eucholoeops more than they did in other megalonychids.

Like other megalonychids, Eucholoeops likely fed primarily on leaves, relying primarily on orthal (up-and-down) movements of the jaw to process food. Its teeth would have sheared and cut vegetation as it masticated. The environment in which it lived was likely open and fairly cool, with low precipitation for most of the year. Temperate and semi-arid forests covered most of the Santa Cruz environment, and seasonal flooding gave rise to grass-covered marshlands. The fauna of Eucholoeops coexisted with included South American native ungulates, other ground sloths, and phorusrhacid birds.

== Taxonomy ==
=== Early history ===
The type specimen of Eucholoeops was a complete skull and mandible, largely embedded in matrix, discovered on the banks of the Santa Cruz River of southern Patagonia, Argentina. The strata from which it was recovered are part of the early-to-late Miocene Santa Cruz Formation. The specimen ended up in the collection of palaeontologist Carlos Ameghino, and was described and named by his brother, Florentino, in 1887, as part of a larger two-part paper discussing fossils in Carlos' collection. The type specimen has since been lost, and was never figured, as it was never fully extracted from the matrix that encompassed it. Five additional species of Eucholoeops (E. externus, E. fissognathus, E. fronto, E. latirostris, E. litoralis) were named four years later, also by Florentino Ameghino; he went on to name another species, E. curtus, three years later. Two more, E. lafonei and E. latifrons, had been named by Alcide Mercerat, in the same year as Ameghino's first paper. These were synonymised with existing species by Ameghino. In 1894, Richard Lydekker suggested that most of the Santa Cruz ground sloth genera could be whittled to just two: Eucholoeops and Pseudhapalops. Hapalops, named by Ameghino in 1887, was considered a junior synonym of Eucholoeops. This extreme taxonomic lumping not been followed by subsequent authors. The validity of most of the species named after E. ingens has been called into question, and they are currently treated as junior synonyms. The type specimen of E. fronto consists of a maxilla and a mandible, and in the absence of the original type specimen, the mandible (MPM-PV 3401) has been designated the neotype of E. ingens.

=== Classification ===
Eucholoeops was a megalonychid, a family within the order Folivora which contains all of sloths. Megalonychids existed from the Deseadan SALMA (29–21 mya) to the Rancholabrean NALMA (240,000 BCE to 11,000 BCE), the last surviving genus being Megalonyx itself from North America. Megalonychids were long-considered to be an extant group including the two-toed sloth genus Choeloepus. However, analyses of the collagen and DNA of fossils of folivorans proved that Choloepus was instead related to mylodontids, another family of ground sloths. Fossils of early megalonychids are rare, the oldest named being of the genus Deseadognathus from Argentina and Bolivia, though even older fossils from the Early Oligocene have been tentatively reported from Puerto Rico. The megalonychids later saw an explosion in diversity during the Middle-Upper Miocene in the Americas, primarily among the Santacrucian (17.5–16.3 mya) and Friasian (16.3–15.5) sites of Argentina, Uruguay, Venezuela, and Brazil. Extensive waterways formed in South America during this period, giving way to a more subtropical climate fostering a variety of flora and fauna to evolve in this environment. Megalonychids also expanded their range north, with genera like Zacatzontli from Mexico evolving on the North American continent prior to the development of the Isthmus of Panama. Megalonychids had spread throughout the Caribbean and as far north as the Yukon Territory, Canada by their demise at the end of the Pleistocene, though the closely related three-toed sloth Bradypus is extant. Research of evolutionary size trends suggests that in contrast to other ground sloth groups that grew over time, megalonychids did not exponentially increase in mass but instead varied greatly around the same amount until their extinction.

The following sloth family phylogenetic tree is based on collagen and mitochondrial DNA sequence data (see Fig. 4 of Presslee et al., 2019).

- Xenarthra ("Edentata")
  - Cingulata (armadillos and allies)
  - Pilosa
    - Vermilingua (anteaters)
    - Folivora
      - Megalocnidae (Caribbean sloths)
      - - - - - Nothrotheriidae (ground sloths)
              - Megatheriidae (giant ground sloths)
            - - Megalonychidae
              - Bradypodidae (three-toed sloths)
        - Scelidotheriidae (two-toed sloths)

== Description ==
Eucholoeops was smaller than the giants of the Pliocene and Pleistocene (such as Eremotherium and Megatherium). It was, however, still large in comparison to modern sloths. The smallest Eucholoeops skull (MACN-A6413), measured from the upper caniniform teeth to the posterior (rear) margin of the occipital condyles, was a little over 11.5 cm (4.5 in) in length. The largest skull, MPM PV3401, measures around 16.5 cm (6.5 in) in length. It has been estimated that Eucholoeops weighed around 80 kg (180 lb).

=== Skull and dentition ===
The skull of Eucholoeops was similar to that of other megalonychids. Dorsally (from above), it was somewhat convex, in a fashion similar to other megalonychids. The muzzle was fairly robust, more so than in close relatives, which partly contributed to erroneous depictions of Eucholeops with a prominent depression between the viscerocranium (facial part of the skull) and the neurocranium (cranial part of the skull). The skull overall is broader and heavier than that of the related Hapalops, with larger sagittal and occipital crests. Typically among sloths, the premaxillae were only loosely connected to one another and the maxilla. Unlike in other sloth genera, the facial portion of the maxilla stops at the caniniform (a tooth found exclusively in sloths, analogous to the canines of other mammals). The main body of the mandible, the mandibular corpus, was abnormally massive. The coronoid process of the mandible was similar to that of Hapalops, though with a condyle that is slightly higher. Eucholoeops had a dental formula of 5/4: there were four molariforms, flat teeth analogous to the cheek teeth of other mammals, and one caniniform on the upper jaw; there were three lower molars and one lower caniniform on the lower jaw. All of the teeth are separated by small gaps (diastemata). The caniniform was very large, triangular in cross-section, and projected forwards. This is unlike the condition seen in other megalonychids, where the caniniform was small, sometimes cylindrical, and non-projecting. The molariforms, mostly resembled those of other ground sloths, though were notable in that they, especially the first and second molariforms of the upper jaw, were expanded transversely (across), and in some cases were medially and distally compressed. Some individual variation was present. The smallest molariform on the upper jaw was the fourth.

=== Postcranial skeleton ===
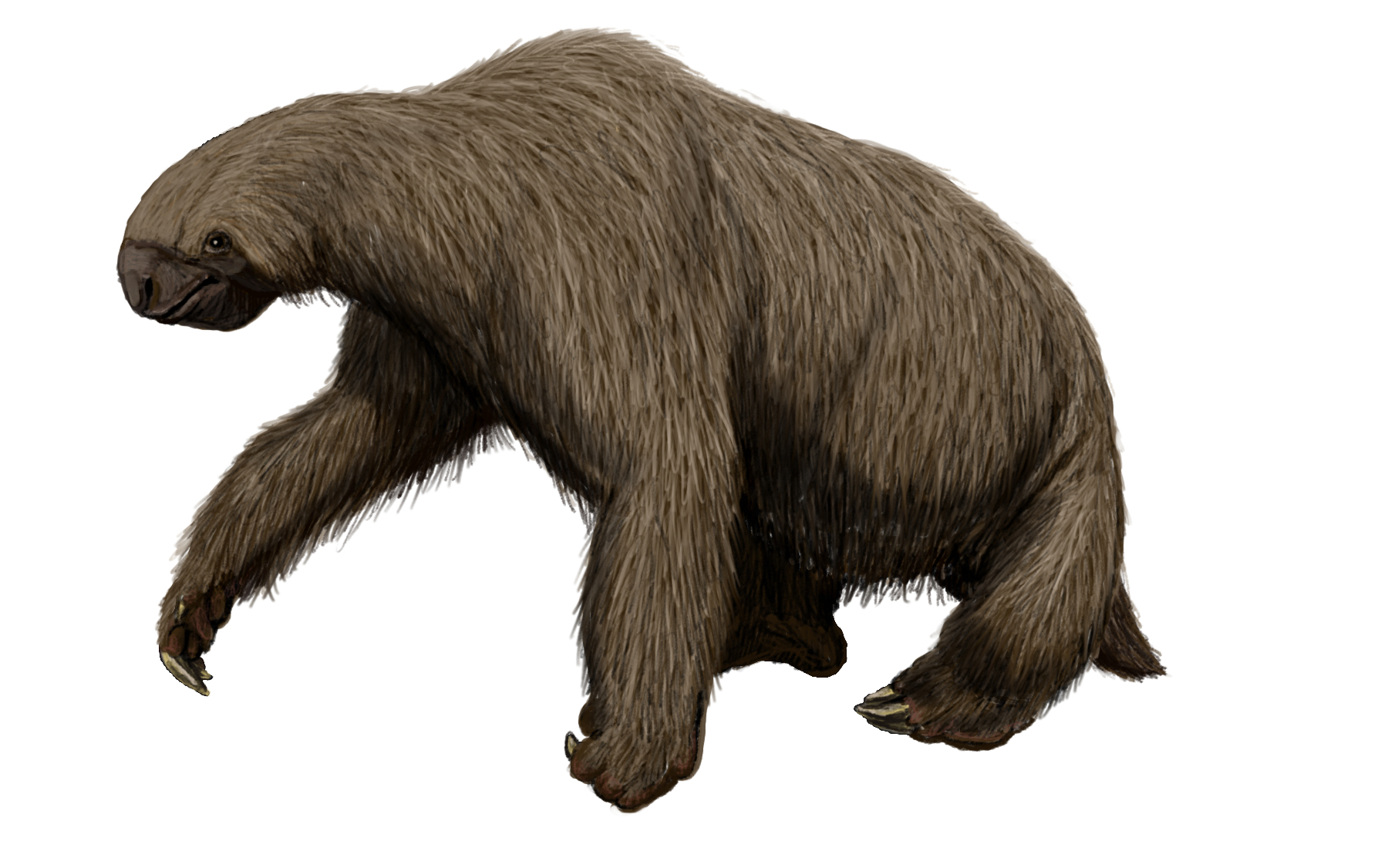
Life restoration of the related ground sloth Megalonyx.

The postcrania of Eucholoeops are represented by limb elements. The humerus is large, with a proximal portion (that close to the body) that is subcylindrical and widen into a flattened distal portion (that far from the body): this condition is seen in all non-mylodontid sloths. Similar to Hapalops, the lesser tubercle is larger than the greater tubercle. As in several other extinct sloth genera, the tubercles are widely separated. The radius has a less steeply inclined head than in other megalonychids. The ulna is not preserved in any specimen. Most of the carpal elements assigned to Eucholoeops are catalogued under FMNH P13125; however, they may belong to Hapalops. The capitate bone of the wrist is wider distally (far from the body axis) than it is proximally, a condition also seen in Megalonyx and members of Nothrotheriidae. The first metacarpal is around half the length of the others. The second and fourth metacarpals are about as robust and long as the third; this differs from the typical sloth condition, second the third and third metacarpals are roughly equal in size, but shorter than the fourth and fifth. The phalangeal (digit) elements do not meaningfully differ from those of other ground sloths. The femur is known only from a single specimen. It is wide and flat, typical for ground sloths, and in many ways, it resembles that of Acratocnus.

== Palaeoecology ==
=== Palaeoenvironment ===
Eucholoeops is known from the Santa Cruz Formation, which dates from the Burdigalian to the early Langhian of the early to middle Miocene (18–15.2 mya). The formation is divided into three temporal intervals: localities FL 1–7, Barrancas Blancas, and Segundas Barrancas Blancas. Of these, Eucholoeops is known only from localities FL 1–7, representing the lower, and thus older, layers of the formation. The depositional environment of the Santa Cruz Formation had a mean annual temperature of around 8 °C, and low precipitation compared to more northern parts of South America at the time. The cooling trend that began in the late Miocene had not yet occurred. The palaeoenvironment was likely fairly open, with temperate and semi-arid forests. Seasonal flooding occurred, likely leading to the formation of marshlands that hosted grasses and forbs. The mammal fauna of the FL 1–7 localities include the meridiolestidan Necrolestes, sparassodonts such as Borhyaena and Cladosictis, several extinct marsupials (including Microbiotherium, a relative of the extant monito del monte), several armadillos (including glyptodonts), the anteater Protamandua, ground sloths (Eucholoeops itself, Hapalops, Hyperleptus, Nematherium, and Pelecynodon), notoungulates (such as Astrapotherium, Interatherium, Nesodon and Thoatherium) the chinchillid Perimys, the octodontid Spaniomys, the porcupine Steiromys, and the primate Homunculus. Birds are represented by ratites, anseriforms, gruiforms, pelicans, storks, falcons, and the phorusrhacids Patagornis and Phorusrhacos. A tegu in the genus Tupinambis and several iguanians and colubrid snakes comprise the Santa Cruz's reptile fauna.

=== Feeding mechanics ===
Megalonychid sloths, and megatherioids as a whole, were (and still are) generally leaf-eaters. Eucholeops, in this regard, was typical of its group. Wear patterns on the teeth suggest orthal movements, simple up-and-down movements of the lower jaw, were the main form of mastication. The temporalis muscle was powerful, suggesting a strong role in such orthal movements. Due to its dental morphology, when chewing, Eucholeops' teeth would have punctured, sheared and torn plant matter.
