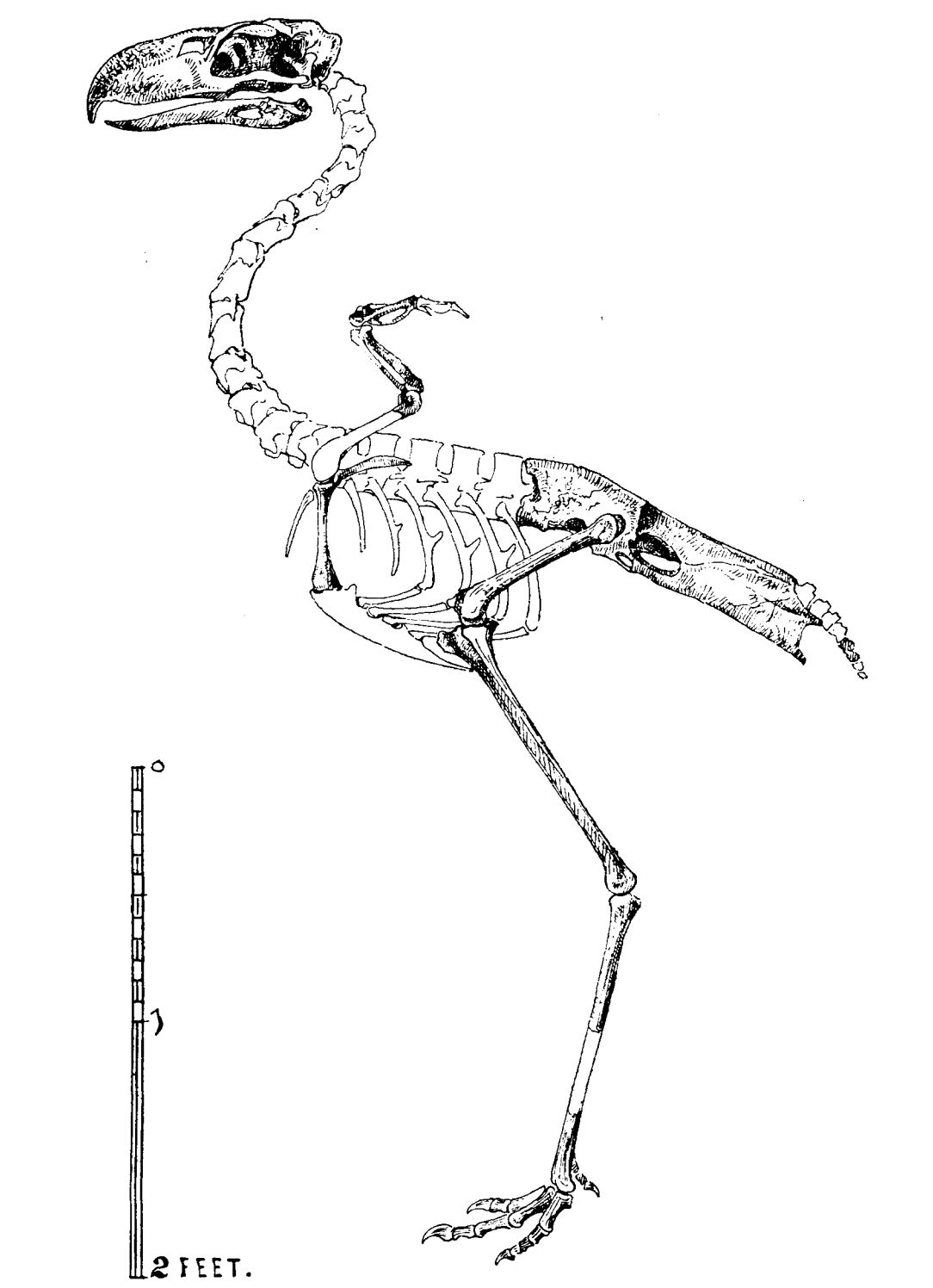
- Skeletal reconstruction of NHMUK A-516

Scientific classification
- Kingdom: Animalia
- Phylum: Chordata
- Class: Aves
- Order: Cariamiformes
- Family: †Phorusrhacidae
- Subfamily: †Patagornithinae
- Genus: †Patagornis; Moreno, & Mercerat 1891

Type species
- †Patagornis marshi Moreno & Mercerat, 1891

Synonyms
- Genus synonymy: Phorusrhacos Ameghino, 1887 (in partim); Palaeociconia Moreno & Mercerat, 1891; Tolmodus Ameghino, 1891; Morenomerceraria Lambrecht, 1933; Species synonymy: Palaeociconia cristata Moreno & Mercerat, 1891; Tolmodus inflatus Ameghino, 1891; Phorusrhacos inflatus (Ameghino, 1891) Ameghino, 1895; Morenomerceraria cristata (Moreno & Mercerat, 1891) Lambrecht, 1933

= Patagornis =

Patagornis Temporal range: Early to Middle Miocene (Burdigalian to Serravallian) 17.7–15.1 Ma

Extinct genus of birds

Patagornis is a genus of phorusrhacid ("terror bird"), an extinct clade of flightless birds, that lived in present-day Argentina during the Miocene age of the Neogene period. The taxonomic history of the genus is long and convoluted. It was described by Argentine paleontologists Francisco Moreno and Alcides Mercerat in 1891. The genus contains one species, P. marshi, named based on a premaxilla (frontmost beak bone) fragment and some incomplete postcranial remains. These fossils were unearthed by an expedition to strata (rock layers) of the Santa Cruz Formation in Santa Cruz Province, southern Argentina. This formation dates to the early-mid section of the Miocene, which makes it around 17.5 to 11.6 million years old. Also in 1891, Moreno's scientific rival, Argentine naturalist Florentino Ameghino, named his own genus and species, Tolmodus inflatus, on the basis of a premaxilla fragment as well. Ameghino also described several well-preserved specimens of Patagornis. After realizing that they came from the same taxon, paleontologists still opted to use the name Tolmodus over Patagornis despite the fact that, according to the rules of the ICZN, Patagornis marshi was the correct name. In 2003, Brazilian paleontologist Herculano Alvarenga and German paleontologist Elizabeth Höfling revalidated Patagornis as the correct name. Although, some scientists still use Tolmodus instead.

Patagornis is among the best-understood phorusrhacids. It is known from several well-preserved specimens, including skulls and nearly complete postcranial skeletons. It was around 90–100 centimetres (3.0–3.3 ft) tall at the back and weighed about 40–50 kilograms (88–110 lb), much smaller than its giant relatives like Kelenken and Phorusrhacos but larger than the other phorusrhacid Psilopterus. Its skull is tall and elongated, similar to that of its kin Andalgalornis and Andrewsornis. The hindlimbs are relatively lethe and adapted for a cursorial (running) lifestyle, suggesting it was a pursuit predator. The taxonomy of Phorusrhacidae is in constant flux, but Patagornis is often regarded as being the type genus of its own subfamily, Patagornithinae. This subfamily includes the other phorusrhacids Andalgalornis and Andrewsornis, though some phylogenetic analyses (studies of the evolutionary relationships of organisms) have found it to be more closely related to phorusrhacines like Phorusrhacos.

Remains of Patagornis are exclusively known from the Miocene of southern Argentina, a region which was covered in grasslands, interspersed with forests, and contained a diverse array of reptiles, birds, and mammals when Patagornis lived. Fossils have also been recovered from the Cerro Boleadoras Formation, which dates to between 16.5 and 15.1 million years ago, and the older Monte León Formation. Patagornis potentially preyed on small-medium sized mammals such as the litoptern Thoatherium and the ground sloth Hapalops. Additionally, it may have competed with the carnivorous sparassodont marsupials Arctodictis and Prothylacinus for food.

== History and taxonomy ==
=== Discovery and naming ===
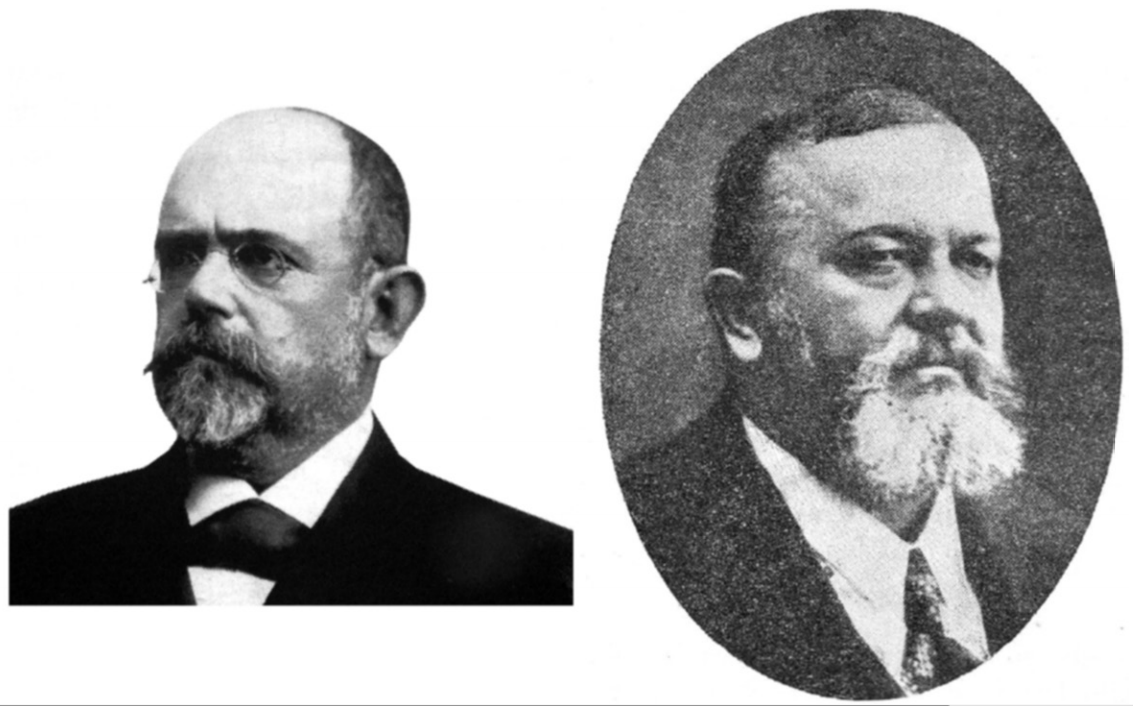
Portraits of Argentine paleontologists Francisco Moreno (left) and Alcides Mercerat (right), the describers of Patagornis

The taxonomic history of Patagornis is muddled on account of the fragmentary nature of fossils, few of which overlap with others, little consensus between researchers, and competition between scientists. In the 19th century, scientific interest in the rich "Tertiary" (now Neogene) fossil sites of Argentina boomed. This included exploration by two teams of Argentine paleontologists; Florentino and Carlos Ameghino, who operated independently, and Francisco Pascasio Moreno and Alcides Mercerat of the Museo de La Plata (MLP). Their discoveries comprised thousands of fossils from Cenozoic fossil deposits throughout Patagonia and central Argentina. Initially, Moreno hired the Ameghinos as staff at the MLP in 1887; Florentino operated as a researcher and Deputy Director, while his brother conducted expeditions and assisted with preparation. However, the relationship between Moreno and Florentino Ameghino deteriorated, culminating in the Ameghinos' resignation from the MLP in 1888. Operating independently of any institutions until 1902, the Ameghinos competed with Moreno and the Museo de La Plata to discover and describe as many new fossils as they could. This led to the description of many genera and species based on fragmentary, undiagnostic, or poorly described material.

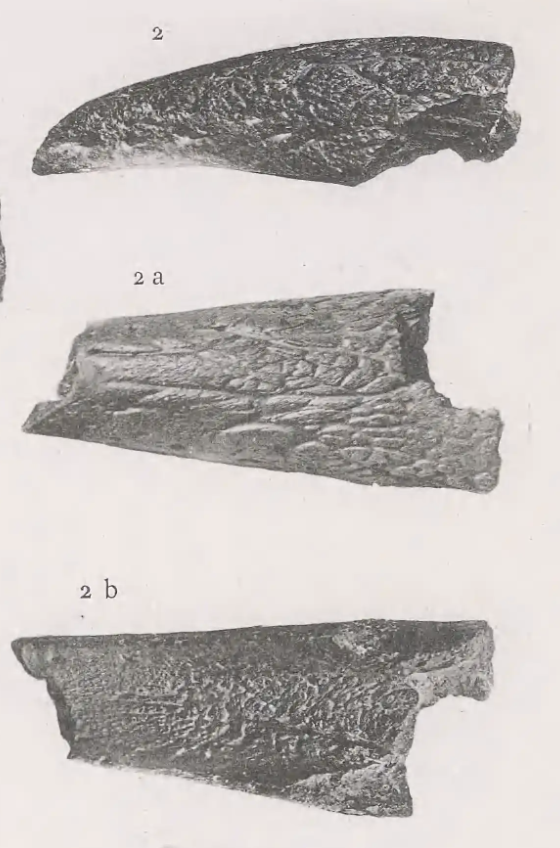
The lectotype premaxilla of P. marshi

The first known discovery of Patagornis fossils was made by crews of the MLP during the late 1880s. The material, consisting of a mandibular symphysis (the area where the two mandibles meet) fragment, then thought to be from the premaxilla (the frontmost upper jaw bone), was collected from an unknown locality of the Santa Cruz Formation in Santa Cruz Province, southern Argentina. Although then believed to be from the Eocene period, nicknamed the "Pyrotherium Beds", it is now thought to date to the upper section of the middle Miocene epoch. This specimen (which was later deposited at the MLP under specimen number MLP-143-158) likely includes other elements from the same individual, consisting of: three vertebrae, sacrum fragments, scapula fragments, proximal (towards body) end of the left femur, distal (away from body) end of the right femur, sections of the right tibia, incomplete tarsometatarsi, unguals, and unidentified pieces.

In May 1891, Moreno and Mercerat scientifically described the remains and assigned them to a new genus and species of bird, which they named Patagornis marshi. The generic name Patagornis is a combination of Patagonia, where the fossils were discovered, and Ancient Greek: ὄρνις, romanized: ornis 'bird'. The specific name is in honor of American paleontologist Othniel Charles Marsh, who made his own discoveries of fossil birds in the American West. Later, the mandibular symphysis fragment (MLP-143) was selected as the lectotype (name-bearing) specimen of P. marshi. In the same paper, P. lemoinei and P. bachmanni were named as species of Patagornis. However, they were unearthed in lower Miocene rocks of the Monte León Formation and have since been moved to the genus Psilopterus. Moreno and Mercerat (1891) described a multitude of new phorusrhacid (then called stereornithine) genera and species, many of which were based on fragmentary or isolated fossils. This included Palaeociconia cristata, which was known only from two vertebrae and two unguals that had also been unearthed from layers of the Santa Cruz Formation. In 1933, Hungarian paleontologist Kálmán Lambrecht moved Palaeociconia cristata to another genus, Morenomerceraria. However, it is now considered a synonym of Patagornis marshi.

=== Florentino Ameghino and Tolmodus ===
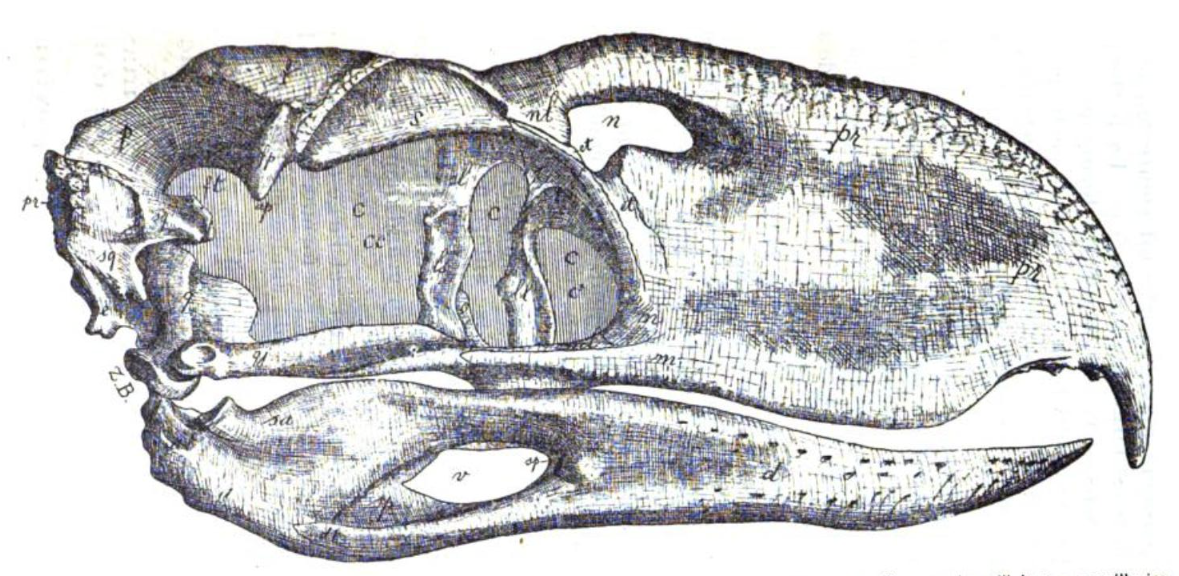
Skull of NHMUK A516

Simultaneously, Moreno's rival, Florentino Ameghino, was conducting his own expeditions to Santa Cruz Formation strata. In August 1891, Ameghino scientifically described a new genus and species of phorusrhacid (then incorrectly spelled "phororhacid") bird (though at the time he believed it was a megalonychid sloth), Tolmodus inflatus, on the basis of a premaxilla fragment. The generic name Tolmodus derives from Ancient Greek: τολμάω, romanized: tolmáo 'bold' and ὀδούς odoús 'tooth', based on the assumption that Tolmodus was a toothed mammal. The specific name inflatus comes from Latin: īnflō 'blow' or 'inflated' due to its large size. In 1895, Ameghino classified Tolmodus in Phorusrhacidae. Although it was named months before Tolmodus, the name Patagornis remained unused in scientific literature for over a century. Authors such as American paleontologist Bryan Patterson and Argentine naturalists Lucas Kraglievich and Ángel Cabrera used Tolmodus over Patagornis in several studies in the 20th century, despite the fact that Patagornis had precedent. Due to the fact that the name Patagornis was not used for over 100 years, according to Article 23 of the International Code of Zoological Nomenclature (ICZN), the name Tolmodus would take priority. However, in 2003 Brazilian paleontologist Herculano Alvarenga and German paleontologist Elizabeth Höfling opted to revalidate the name Patagornis and considered Tolmodus a junior synonym (the same taxon as a previously named taxon). The use of both Tolmodus and Patagornis is prevalent in scientific literature, with little consensus on what is the correct generic title.

In 1895, Ameghino published his most extensive description of phorusrhacids, including Phorusrhacos inflatus. One of these specimens included a nearly complete skeleton, among the best known from a phorusrhacid. In 1895 and 1896, Ameghino and Moreno sold much of their respective fossil bird collections to the Natural History Museum of London (NHMUK). This included the skeleton described by Ameghino, which was cataloged under NHMUK PV A 516. In 1899, British paleontologist Charles William Andrews described the skeleton in detail. By 1911, Ameghino had died and Moreno had retired, leaving behind a legacy of convoluted phorusrhacid taxonomy. Many European naturalists did not study Ameghino's or Moreno's taxa, especially their phorusrhacids, due to their confusing taxonomy. In the same 1895 paper, Ameghino named a new species of Phorusrhacos, P. modicus, on the basis of an associated humerus and tarsometatarsus that was found in strata of the Santa Cruz Formation in Santa Cruz Province. In 1967, American paleontologist Pierce Brodkorb stated that P. modicus was a synonym of Patagornis marshi, however it has also been considered a synonym of Psilopterus lemoinei or P. australis. Another specimen, a premaxilla fragment from the same site, was assigned to the rhea Opisthodactylus but is now believed to belong to Patagornis.

=== Later discoveries ===
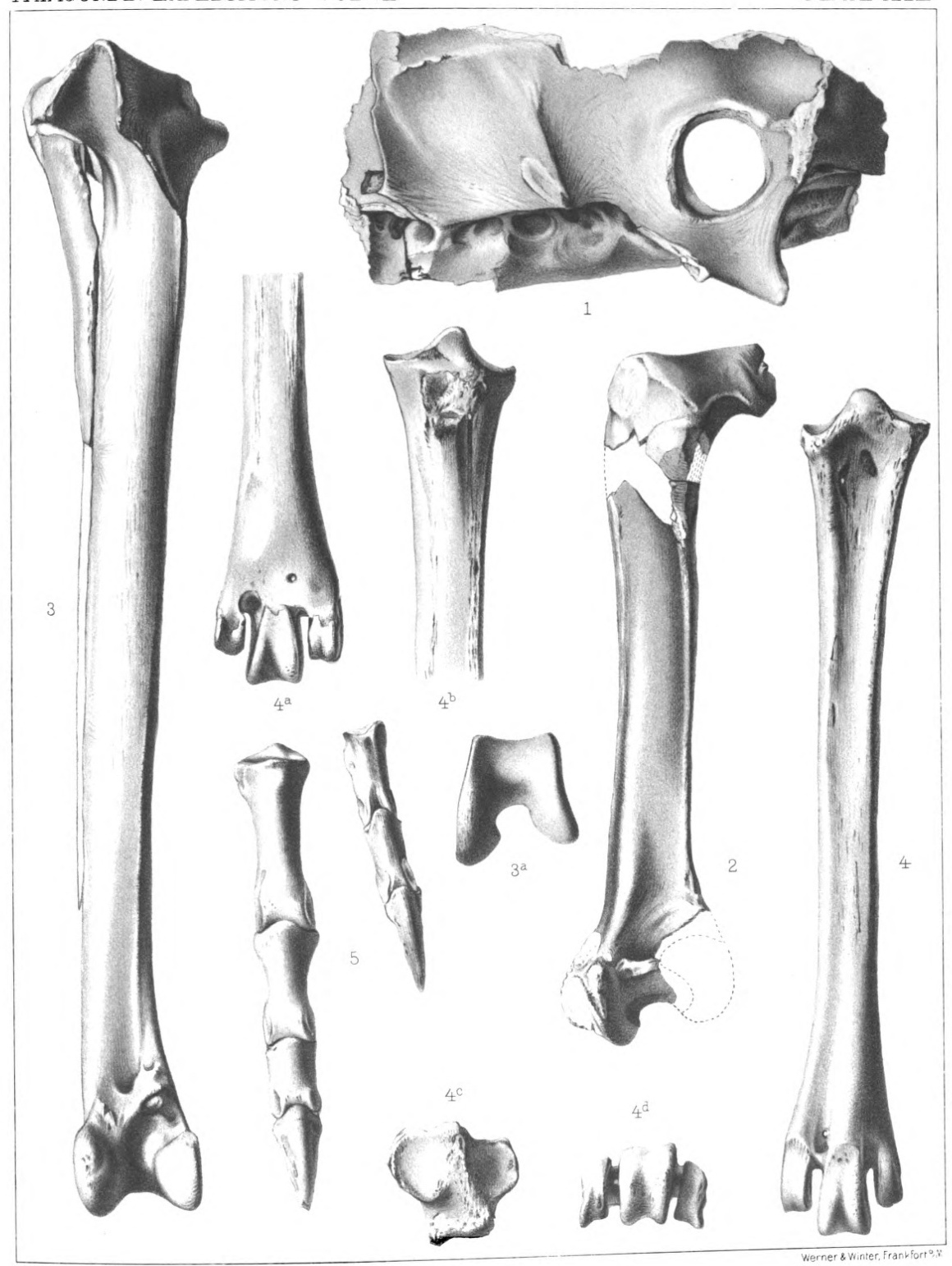
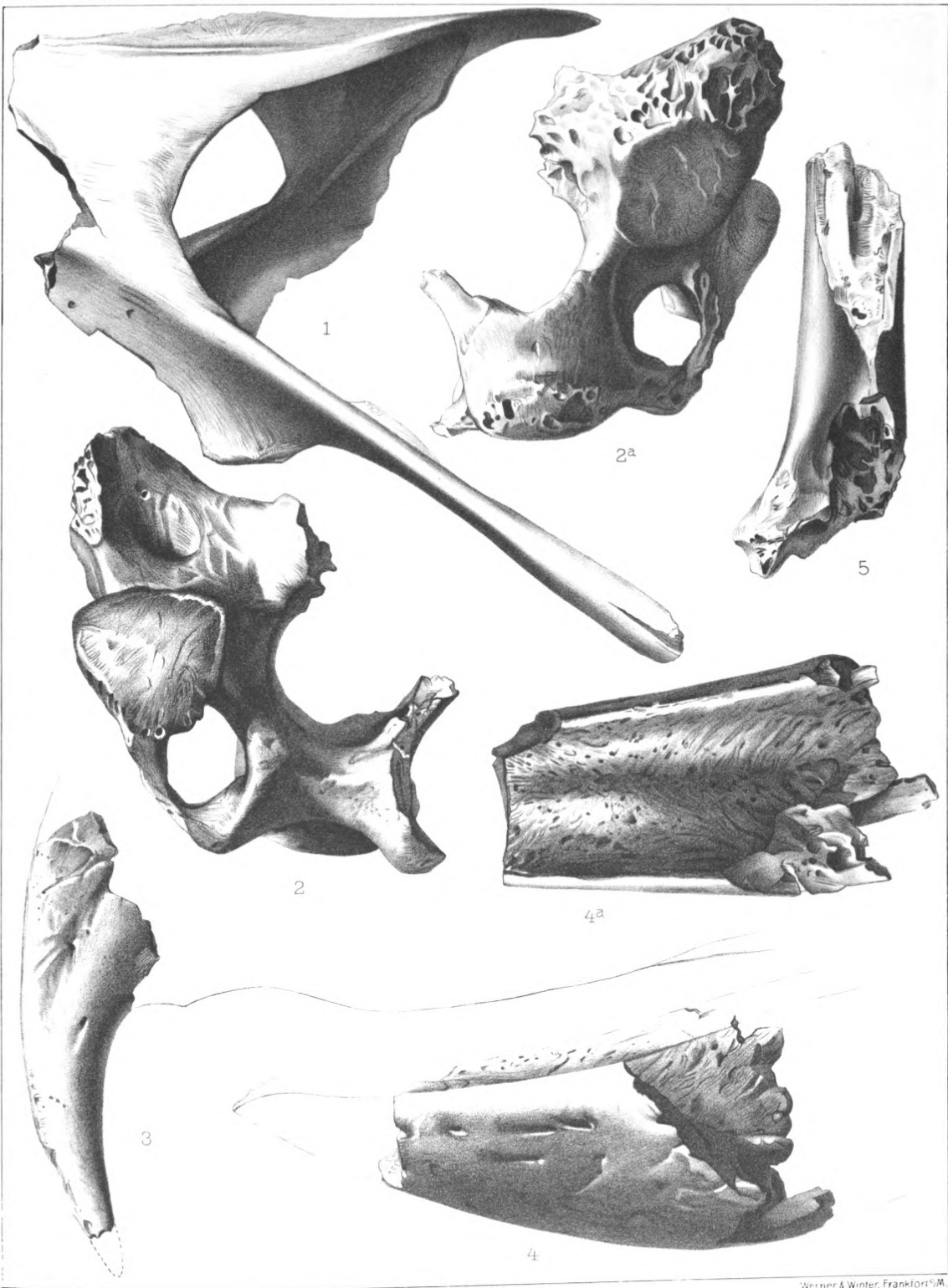
Remains of P. marshi unearthed by the Princeton University expeditions, including hindlimb (AMNH 9264; left) and pes (AMNH 9497; left) material

At the close of the 19th century, American universities and institutions began taking an interest in the Neogene fauna of Patagonia. Inspired by Ameghino's papers and descriptions, these universities and institutions sought to establish their own collections of Santacrucian mammals and birds, including those of Phorusrhacos. Between 1896 and 1899, Princeton University students, under the leadership of American paleontologist John Bell Hatcher, led a series of expeditions to the same outcrops in Santa Cruz Province. Princeton was joined by the American Museum of Natural History on the last of these expeditions, altogether collecting a trove of new fossil bird and mammal material. Furthermore, in 1902, American professor William B. Scott ventured to the MLP and Ameghino's collections to photograph and review the taxa named prior by Ameghino, Moreno, and Mercerat. His studies, along with those of Hatcher, American paleontologist William John Sinclair, and others, culminated in a series of monographs that were published between 1903 and 1912 by Princeton University. Although they reviewed Ameghino's mammal taxa in detail, their description of some of the phorusrhacid remains was brief. In 1926, American paleontologist Marcus Farr traveled to the NHMUK in order to study the Ameghino collection, with the assistance of Dr. F. A. Bather, the museum's curator.

In 1932, Sinclair and Farr described the newly found phorusrhacid material in detail, assigning much of it to Pelecyornis (a synonym of Psilopterus) and Phorusrhacos. In their study, they briefly touched on the convoluted taxonomy of the clade, stating that there were likely too many genera and species of stereornithes named. From a locality 10 miles north of Cape Fairweather, Santa Cruz, American paleontologist Barnum Brown unearthed an associated postcranial skeleton from a phorusrhacid (AMNH 9264) consisting of an incomplete pelvis, right femur (thigh bone), tibiotarsus (shin bone), tarsometatarsus, and pes (foot). Sinclair and Farr (1932) did not assign it to a specific species, instead referring to it simply as Phororhacos sp., while Alvarenga and Höfling (2003) assigned it to Patagornis marshi. In February 2020, an expedition by the MLP to outcrops of the middle Miocene-aged Cerro Boleadoras Formation unearthed a multitude of fossils, including an isolated metatarsal fragment of Patagornis. This discovery expanded the known distribution of the genus westward and the known interval, as the Cerro Boleadoras Formation dates to between 16.5 and 15.1 million years old.

== Description ==
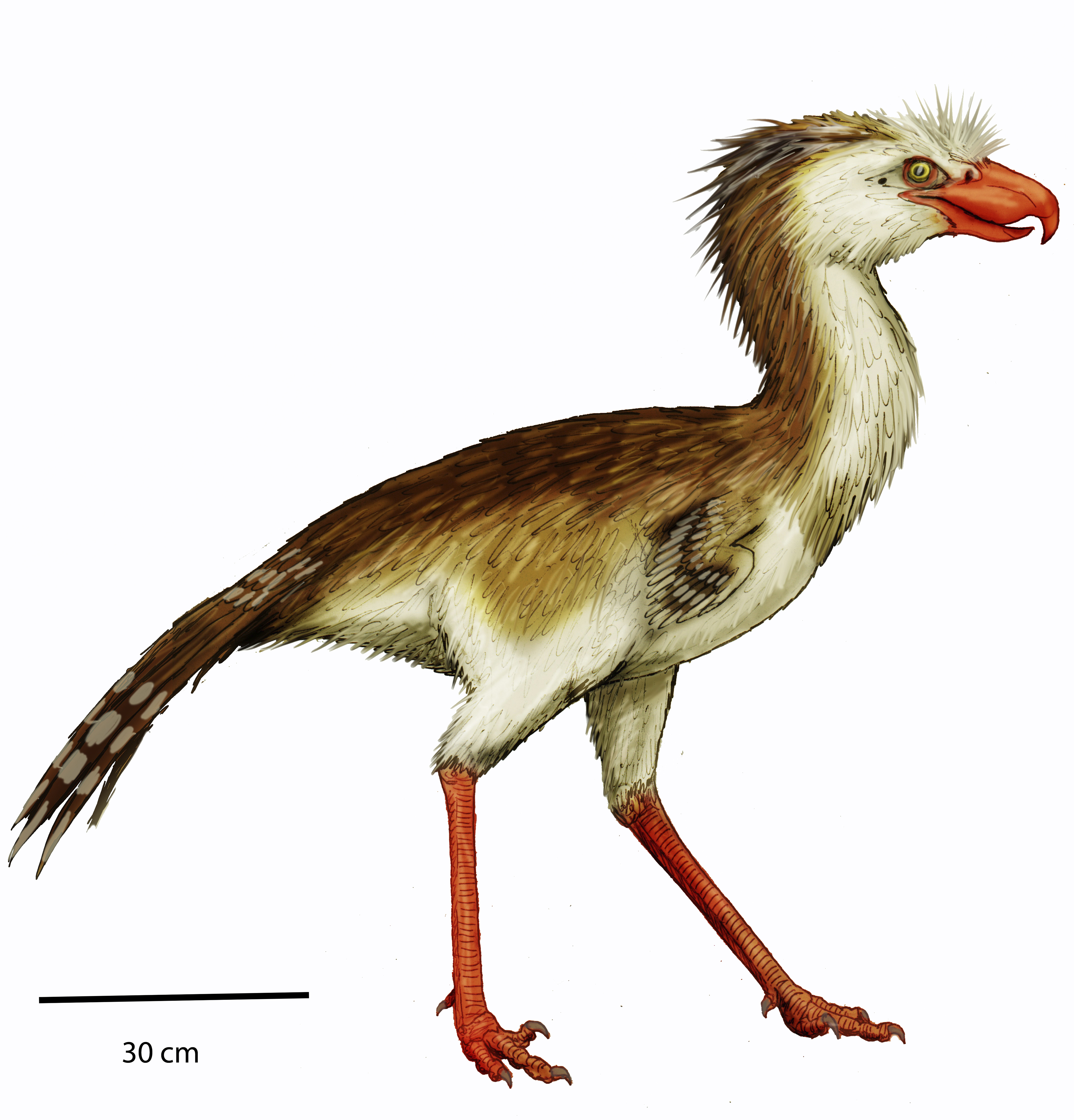
Life restoration

Overall, like other phorusrhacids, Patagornis has a large, elongated skull with a sharp beak. The abdomen and wings are small in contrast to the long, lithe hindlimbs. Patagornis was about 0.9–1 meter (3.0–3.3 ft) tall at the back and 45–50 kilograms (99–110 lb) in mass.

=== Anatomy ===
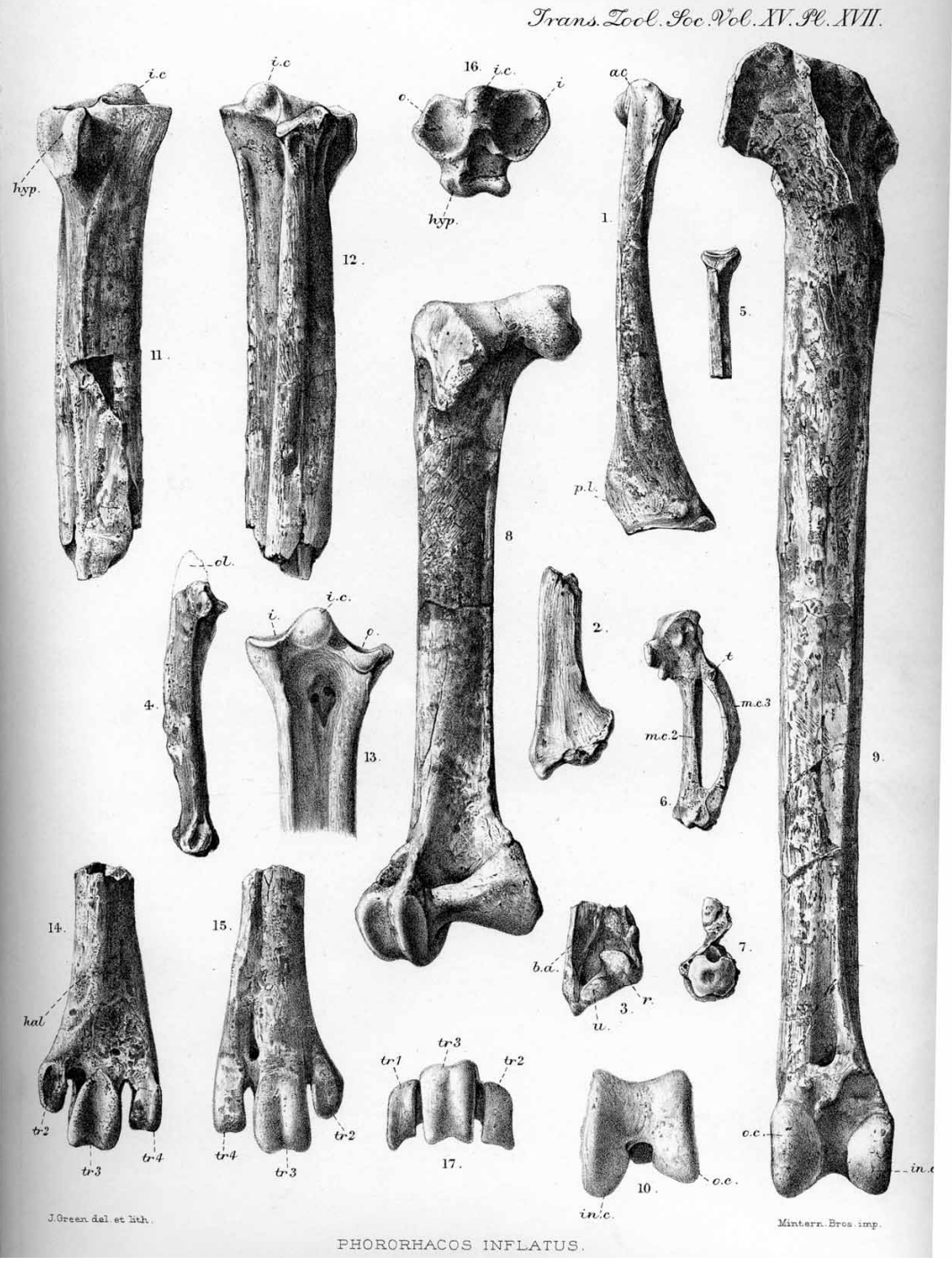
Hindlimb bones of NHMUK A-516

The most complete skeleton, NHMUK PV A516, contains the skull, mandible, scapulocoracoid (shoulder girdle), wing bones, pelvis (hip bone), hindlimbs, and some vertebrae (backbones). Its skull measures 33.7 centimetres (13.3 in) in length from occipital to the end of the premaxilla and 12 centimetres (4.7 in) at its greatest width. Proportionally, it is similar to other tall-skulled phorusrhacids like Phorusrhacos, Andalgalornis, and Andrewsornis, but differs greatly from genera with slim, elongated skulls like Kelenken. The skull's anterior (front) margin of the antorbital fenestra (a large gap in the skull) is moderately inclined, while in Andalgalornis and Andrewsornis have a steeply inclined margin. The dorsal (top) side of the nostrils is relatively tall with a high peak, unlike those of other phorusrhacids. Alvarenga & Hofling describe the dorsal portion of the nostrils as "very conspicuous". In Patagornis, the dorsal ridge of the posterior (back) premaxillary processes (extensions of bone) are convex. These processes also are robust and protrude above the rostrum, unlike in genera like Mesembriornis, Procariama, and Andalgalornis. Convergently, Psilopterus evolved a similar characteristic. The occipital (back skull bone) region is flat and wider transversely (from left to right) than dorsoventrally (tall).

NHMUK PV A516 is one of the few phorusrhacid specimens that preserves the hyoid. The anterior part, the entoglossol, is enlarged and composed of two ceratohyals (bony rods). These components are united by a thin bony plate. The ceratohyals articulate at two points on their posterior ends. On the ventral side of the plate is a trench which deepens posteriorly (towards the back). In contrast to the albatross, the entoglossal is relatively greater in size with a thinner basihyal. Overall, the hyoid is most similar to that of Cariama, but differs in that it lacks a foramen (pit) on the median of the entoglossal. Its mandibular symphysis measures 30.2 centimetres (11.9 in) long and is somewhat curved, but lacks a tall tip. Patagornis' cervical and dorsal vertebrae are relatively lithe compared to those of Andalgalornis. Both genera preserve elongated, wide, flat, and tall pelves. Ameghino (1895) stated that the tarsometatarsus of Phorusrhacos is overall extremely similar to that of Patagornis except for its size. However, the distal end of P. longissimus' is proportionally wider and flatter with a lower posterior fossa (the area where the largest pedal phalange articulates with the tarsometatarsus) than in Patagornis.

== Paleobiology ==
=== Speed ===
The walking speed of birds is determined by the ratio of the two leg bones tibiotarsus and tarsometatarsus and by their strength. At Patagornis this ratio is almost 70%, meaning that the taxon was very agile, a trait common among the smaller Patagornithines. Research from 2005 therefore showed that the animal had a maximum speed of 50 km/h, about the same speed as the living rhea.

==== Leg function ====
In 2005, Argentine researcher Rudemar Ernesto Blanco and American scientist Washington W. Jones examined the strength of the tibiotarsus (shin bone) of phorusrhacids to determine their speed, but conceded that such estimates can be unreliable even for extant animals. The tibiotarsal strength of Patagornis and an indeterminate large phorusrhacine suggested a speed of 14 m/s (50 km/h; 31 mph), and that of Mesembriornis suggested 27 m/s (97 km/h; 60 mph); the latter is greater than that of a modern ostrich, approaching that of a cheetah, 29 m/s (100 km/h; 65 mph). They found these estimates unlikely due to the large body size of these birds, and instead suggested the strength could have been used to break the long-bones of medium-sized mammals, the size for example of a saiga or Thomson's gazelle. This strength could be used for accessing the marrow inside the bones, or by using the legs as kicking weapons (like some modern ground birds do), consistent with the large, curved, and sideways compressed claws known in some phorusrhacids. They also suggested future studies could examine whether they could have used their beaks and claws against well-armored mammals such as armadillos and glyptodonts.

=== Quill knobs ===
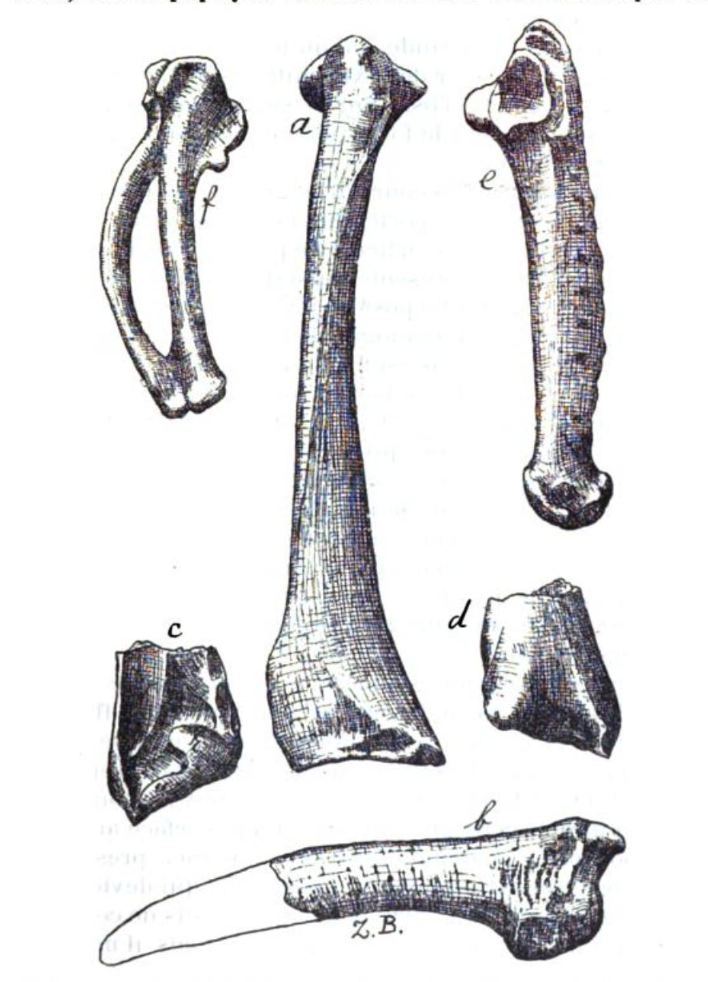
Forelimb of NHMUK A-516, including the ulna showing the quill knobs (top right)

NHMUK PV A 516's ulna preserves large, spur-like quill knobs on the posterior end that may have been the attachment point for elongate feathers. These feathers were theorized to have been used for assistance in running, as implied by its ecology and limb anatomy, or as a shield like those of the secretarybird. The former theory is more likely based on the anatomy of the quill knobs themselves and their presence in the related Llallawavis, which shares its cursorial-adapted anatomy. The ungual phalanges preserved in Patagornis and its distant relative Mesembriornis are large, curved, and thin laterally, likely being used to stab prey based on those of modern predatory birds.

=== Ear anatomy ===
In 2015 during their study on the ear anatomy of phorusrhacids, Degrange et al also studied the internal ear anatomy preserved in Llallawavis, Patagornis, & several modern birds. They discovered that Patagornis had poor hearing, the smallest hearing range in the Cariamiformes studied. The semicircular canals of Llallawavis were much more elongated compared to the short canals of Patagornis, and with the greater body mass, it was inferred that there were more sluggish head movements in this taxon, with enhanced sensitivity to low-amplitude motions.

=== Histology and growth ===
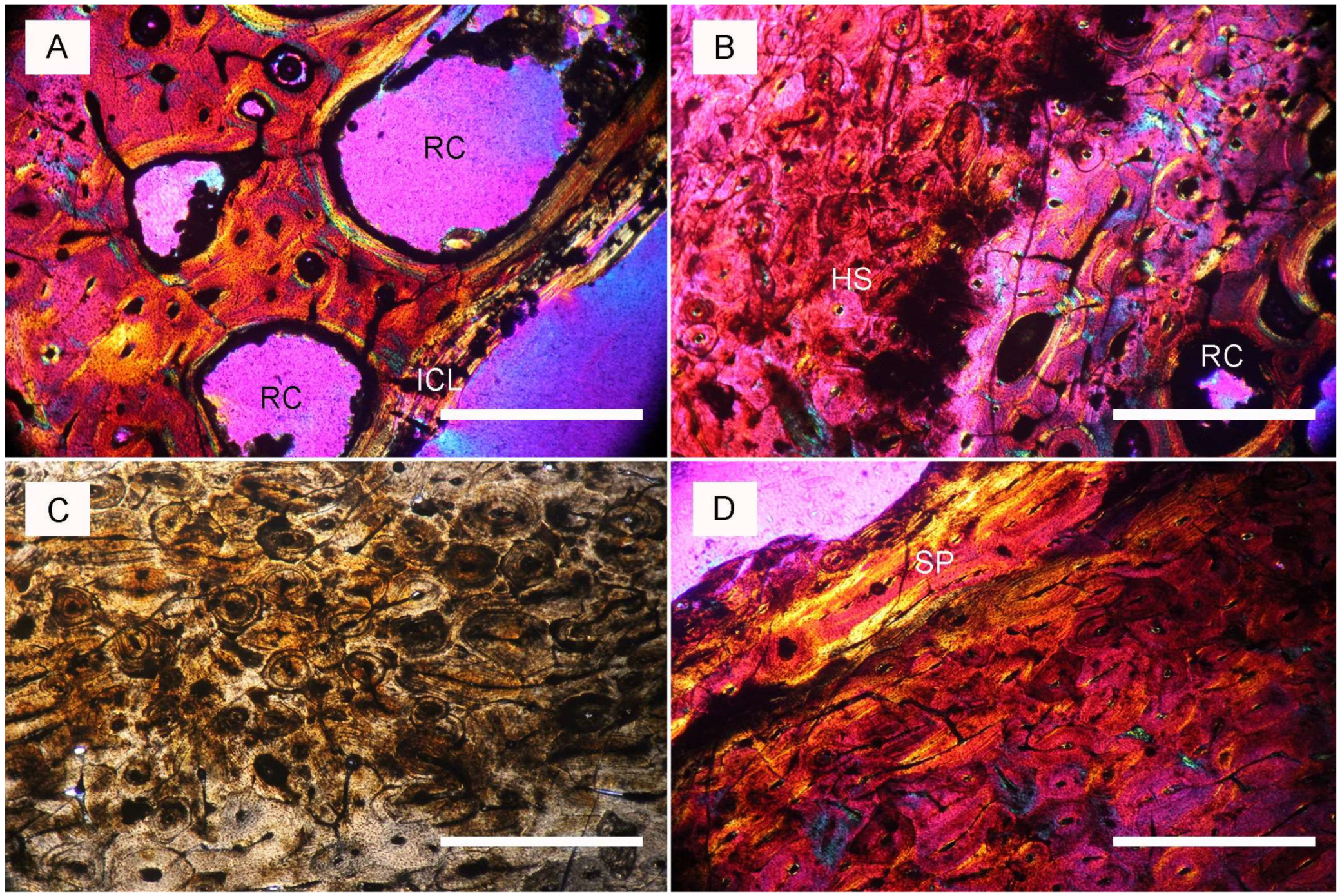
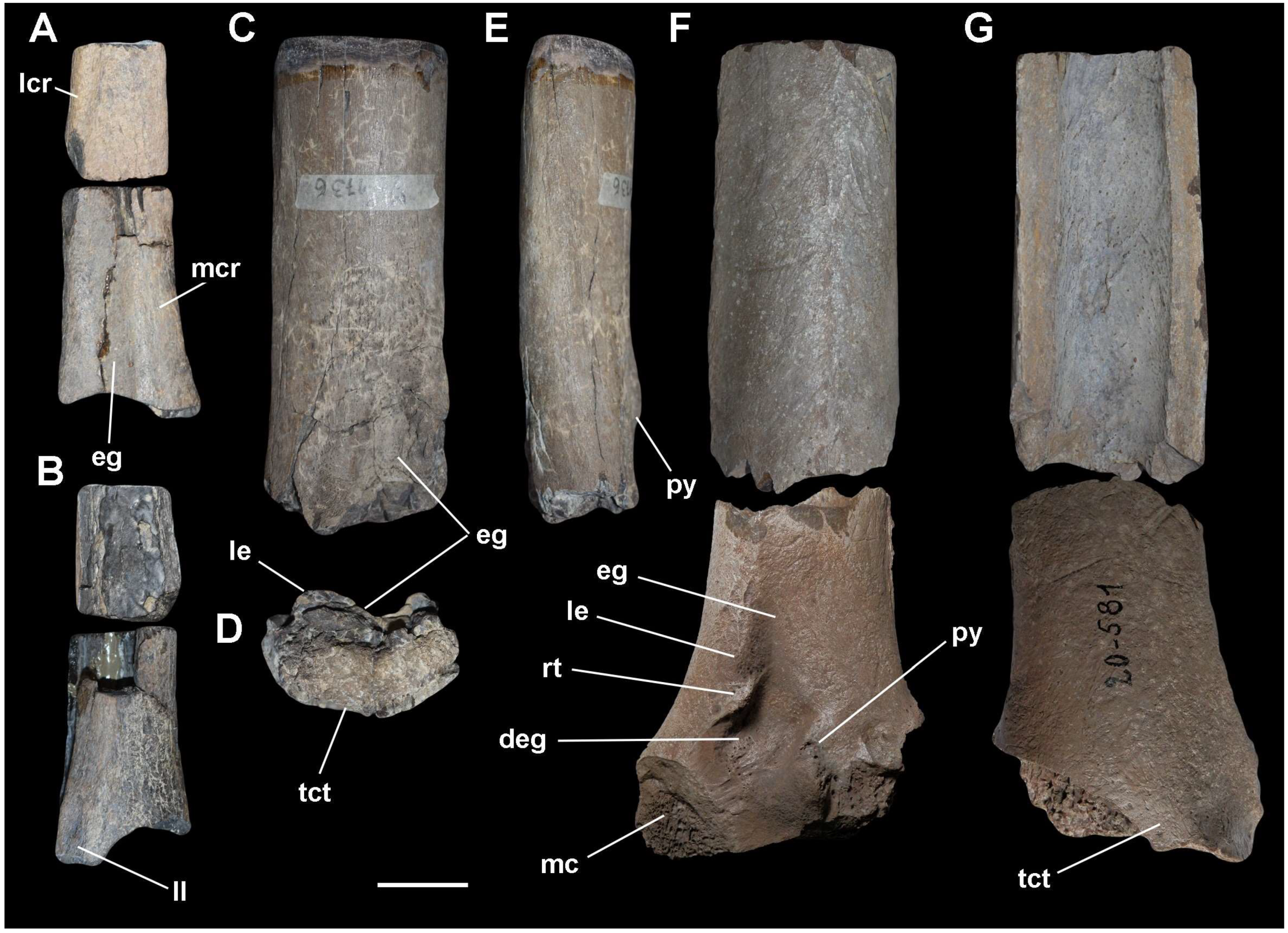
Histological cross-sections (left) of P. marshi bones (right)

In 2025, Argentine paleontologist Jordi Alexis Garcia Marsà and colleagues published a study wherein they analyzed the bone histology of Patagornis and Brontornis, using an incomplete tarsometatarsus and a partial tibiotarsus respectively. The subperiosteum (a membrane covering the outer surface of a bone) of both birds kept vascular canals (areas for vascular systems to run through) while lacking a circumferential layer on the outer walls of the bone, a combination of traits not seen in ornithurines like kiwis and dodos. This implies that Brontornis and Patagornis may have reached sexual and skeletal maturity prior to somatic maturity, whereas in most other ornithurines, such as kiwis and dodos, somatic maturation occurs first. The fossils studied indicated they came from fully grown individuals based on the presence of a smooth outer bone texture, which is a signifier of skeletal maturity.

Later in the study, Marsà and colleagues noted that Patagornis and Brontornis had an uninterrupted growth pattern which may have been a consequence of living in stochastic, continental environments. The bone tissues contained a deeply vascularized fibrolamellar matrix and an uninterrupted cortex, similar to tissues of extant ornithurines which attained adult body size in under a year. In contrast to insular flightless birds like moas, Malagasy aepyornithids, and the dodo, Patagornis and Brontornis had an uninterrupted growth strategy. This likely reflects the fact that the selection pressures of continental life favored uninterrupted growth, whereas stable island life with a paucity of predators allowed for a more flexible growth pattern.

== Classification ==
Patagornis is classified in the family Phorusrhacidae, a group of flightless, carnivorous cariamiform birds that existed during the Paleogene, Neogene, and Quaternary in the Americas. This group is diverse, including small psilopterines like Psilopterus and Eschatornis, medium-sized patagornithines like Patagornis and Andrewsornis, and giant phorusrhacines like Devincenzia, Kelenken, and Titanis. In 1895, Ameghino classified Phorusrhacos, Tolmodus, and Physornis in Phorusrhacidae, an assessment that later research has supported. Meanwhile, Moreno and Mercerat preferred the term "Stereornithes" over Phorusrhacidae and included Patagornis in the order, which they believed was allied to the Ratites. In 1897, Mercerat erected the family Patagornithidae for Patagornis and Pelecyornis (a synonym of Psilopterus), which were united by features of their humeri and tarsometatarsi. However, the name went unused in scientifici literature until 2003, when Alvarenga and Höfling revalidated it as the subfamily Patagornithinae. In 1932, Kraglievich divided Phorusrhacidae into two subfamilies: Phorusrhacinae and Tolmodinae. Phorusrhacinae was stated to include giant genera like Phorusrhacos, Devincenzia, and Onactornis, whereas Tolmodinae bore medium-sized genera like Tolmodus, Andrewsornis, and Andalgalornis. The subfamily name "Tolmodinae" is still used in studies which prefer Tolmodus over Patagornis, but it has been considered synonymous with Patagornithinae. In his own taxonomic scheme, a 1967 review by Brodkorb considered Palaeociconia the correct name and created the subfamily Palaeociconiinae to group Palaeocionia, Andrewsornis, and Andalgalornis. It too is synonymous with Patagornithinae.

In their 2003 study, Alvarenga and Höfling defined Patagornithinae as the clade including Patagornis and its closest kin, which were united by their medium sizes, long, narrow mandibular symphyses, long, slender tarsometararsi, and overall comparatively smaller, lither build than phorusrhacines. They included only Patagornis, Andrewsornis, and Andalgalornis in the clade. In both 2011 and 2015 studies, Patagornithinae was found in a poltytomy (an unresolved cladistic relationship) with taxa not included in the subfamily by Alvarenga and Höfling (2003), such as Physornis and Phorusrhacos. In 2025, Agnolín and colleagues suggested that the other phorusrhacid Patagorhacos was a close relative of Patagornis.

The following phylogenetic tree shows the internal relationships of Phorusrhacidae under the exclusion of Brontornis as published by Degrange and colleagues in 2015, which recovers Patagornis as a member of a large clade that includes Physornis, Phorusrhacos and Andalgalornis, among others.

Topology 1: Alvarenga et al. (2011) results

- Phorusrhacidae
  - Mesembriornithinae
  - - Psilopterinae
    - - Patagornis
      - Andrewsornis
      - Andalgalornis
      - Phorusrhacos
      - Titanis
      - - Devincenzia
        - Kelenken
      - Brontornis
      - Physornis
      - Paraphysornis

Topology 2: Degrange et al. (2015) results

- Phorusrhacidae
  - - Mesembriornithinae
    - Psilopterinae
  - - Kelenken guillermoi
    - - Devincenzia pozzi
      - - Titanis walleri
        - - - Phorusrhacos longissimus
            - Andalgalornis steulleti
            - Andrewsornis abbotti
            - Patagornis marshi
            - Physornis fortis
          - Paraphysornis brasiliensis

== Paleoecology ==
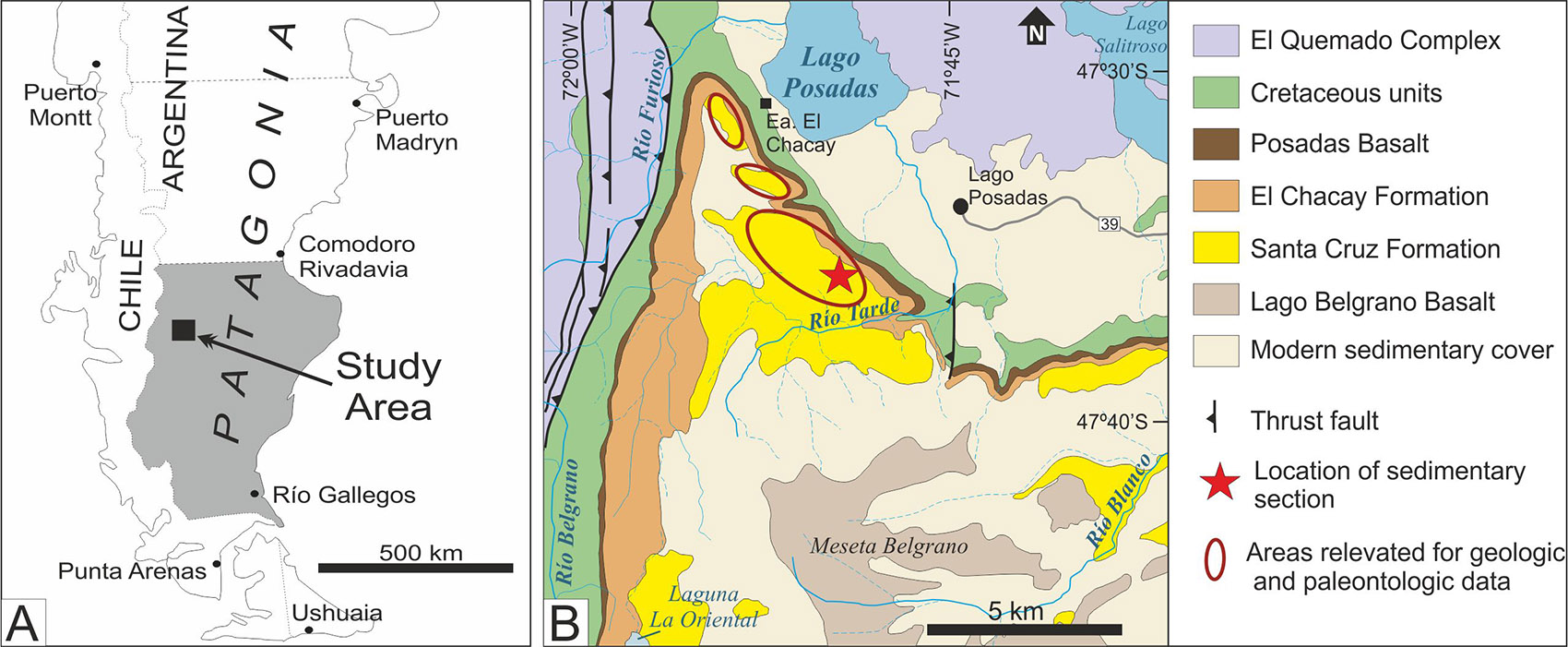
Map of the Santa Cruz Formation, where Patagornis is primarily known

Patagornis is known from multiple sites, mostly from outcrops of the Santa Cruz Formation along the Atlantic coast of southern Argentina. Fragmentary remains have also been described from strata of the early-mid Miocene Cerro Boleadoras Formation, which dates to between 16.5 to 15.1 million years ago, and the Monte León Formation, which dates to between 17.7 and 16 million years ago, in Monte León. All of these formations correspond to the Santacrucian SALMA, which dates to the early Miocene stage (18 to 14 million years ago) of the Neogene. Patagornis is among the most well-understood and abundant phorusrhacids.

The Santa Cruz Formation featured a heterogeneous environment composed of gallery forests, semi-arid and semi-deciduous forests, and open savannas, though grasses were not as common in the Santacrucian than they are now. Open, dry savanna conditions like these were suitable for pursuit predators like Patagornis. This formation also had open shrubland dotted with patches of woodlands, marshes, and seasonally flooded water bodies. The climate was relatively warm, humid, and tropical, comparable to the Atlantic inland forests of Argentina and the dry Chaco region of Paraguay. Its forested areas were clouded by Araucaria conifers, Nothofagus beeches, and laurels among other trees, while grasses like pooideans blanketed the ground. Permanent bodies of water such as lakes, ponds and streams are likely to have been present, which sported frogs like Calyptocephalella, waterbirds like Ankonetta, Eutelornis, and Kaikenia, and the astrapothere Astrapotherium. Many Santacrucian birds were present, including at least 18 species in 15 genera and nine families. This period is considered the peak of phorsurhacid diversity, though it was nearly extinct by the Pleistocene. Other birds known from the formation include the phorusrhacids Phorusrhacos and Psilopterus, the enigmatic Brontornis, the rhea relative Opisthodactylus, the falcon Thegornis, the piscivorous darters Liptornis and Macranhinga, and the possible spoonbill Protibis. A menagerie of carnivorous mammals is known as well, such as the sparassodonts Borhyaena, Acrocyon, Arctodictis, and Lycopsis and the hathliacynid Cladosictis. Megaherbivorous mammals are represented by ground sloths like Prepotherium and Eucholoeops, notoungulate toxodontids Nesodon and Adinotherium, the homalodotheriid Homalodotherium, and the litopterns Diadiaphorus, Theosodon, and Tetramerorhinus. As for smaller herbivores, interatheriids like Cochilius, Interatherium, and Protypotherium, anteater Protamandua, cingulates like Cochlops, Peltephilus, and Propalaehoplophorus, rodents like Perimys, Eocardia, and Steiromys are known.

Patagornis is also known from the coastal Monte Leon Formation that was in the same region in Santa Cruz, but part of the older lower Miocene age. Monte Leon preserved more mudstone and estuarine sediments, but with a very similar fauna to the Santa Cruz Formation as the two formations had a direct transition. The Cerro Boleadoras Formation's sediments are made up of sandstones that were deposited by fluvial channels and were interspersed with mudstone sections. Based on the presence of anurans and testudines, it likely also contained lowland lakes, streams, and possibly forested areas. Patagornis itself occupied open habitats dominated by shrublands or grasslands, which may have been present in the Cerro Boleadoras Formation's environment. The region likely also had conifers and Nothofagus forests, in addition to tall gallery forests. A for fauna, a diverse array of mammals such as the ground sloths Prepoplanops and an indeterminate megatheroid, the cingulates Peltephilus, Vetelia, and Stenotatus, the notoungulates Hegetotherium, Interatherium, and Protypotherium, the litoptern Thoatherium, the rodents Neoreomys and Eocardia, and indeterminate sparassodont marsupial. As for non-mammals, the testudine Chelonoidis, the anuran Calyptocephalella, and the other phorusrhacids Phorusrhacos and Psilopterus have been reported from the Cerro Boleadoras Formation as well.

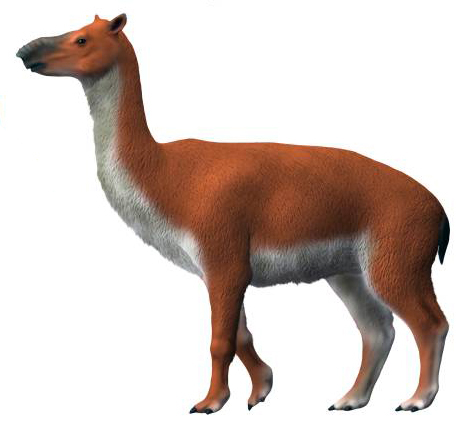
Litopterns such as Theosodon (depicted), were possible prey items for Patagornis

In Santacrucian ecosystems, Patagornis likely preyed upon medium-sized (>10–20 kilograms (22–44 lb)) mammals such as the notoungulate Nesodon, ground sloth Hapalops, and litopterns Thoatherium and Theosodon. Smaller cingulates and unarmored xenarthrans also could have been prey for phorusrhacids. Patagornis bears many cursorial specializations in its hindlimb anatomy, suggesting that it was a pursuit predator in open Santacrucian ecosystems. Based on their shared body sizes and ecological niches, Patagornis may have competed with the sparassodonts Arctodictis and Prothylacynus. However, unlike Patagornis, most sparassodonts were scansorial and occupied forested environments, creating niche partitioning and diminishing interactions between the two groups. Although in a 2012 study, Argentine paleontologist Federico Degrange suggested that phorusrhacids were incapable of hunting prey larger than themselves due to their dependency on head, neck, and hindlimb movement, later studies have countered this by stating that extant birds have proven they can hunt prey significantly greater than themselves.

=== Evolution ===
During the early Cenozoic, after the extinction of the non-bird dinosaurs, mammals underwent an evolutionary diversification, and some bird groups around the world developed a tendency towards gigantism; this included the Gastornithidae, the Dromornithidae, the Palaeognathae and the Phorusrhacidae. Phorusrhacids are an extinct group within Cariamiformes, the only living members of which are the two species of seriemas in the family Cariamidae. While they are the most speciose group within Cariamiformes, the interrelationships between phorusrhacids are unclear due to the incompleteness of their remains.

Phorusrhacids were present in South America from the Paleocene (when the continent was an isolated island) and survived until the Pleistocene. They also appeared in North America at the end of the Pliocene, during the Great American Biotic Interchange, and while fossils from Europe have been assigned to the group, their classification is disputed. It is unclear where the group originated; both cariamids and phorusrhacids may have arisen in South America, or arrived from elsewhere when southern continents were closer together or when sea levels were lower. Since phorusrhacids survived until the Pleistocene, they appear to have been more successful than for example the South American metatherian thylacosmilid predators (which disappeared in the Pliocene), and it is possible that they competed ecologically with placental predators that entered from North America in the Pleistocene.
