= Trapa-Trapa Formation =

Geologic formation in Chile and Argentina

- Stratigraphic range: Miocene
- Type: Geological formation
- Underlies: Cola de Zorro Formation; Campanario Formation
- Overlies: Cura-Mallín Group

Lithology
- Primary: Andesitic lava, basaltic andesite lava, pyroclastic rocks, epiclastic rocks
- Other: Basaltic lava, dacitic lava, tuff

Location
- Coordinates: 38.0°S 71.6°W
- Region: Araucanía, Bío Bío & Maule Regions; Neuquén Province
- Country: Chile, Argentina

Type section
- Named for: Estero Trapa-Trapa
- Trapa-Trapa Formation (Chile)

Trapa-Trapa Formation (Spanish: Formación Trapa-Trapa) is a volcano-sedimentary formation of Miocene age in south-central Chile and nearby parts of Argentina. The largest outcrops lie in the Andes, while the Chilean Central Valley host some of the smaller outcrops. The volcanic rocks of the formation are of calc-alkaline character, and are less silicic than contemporary volcanic rocks found further north in the Farellones Formation.
