= Malleco Formation =

Geologic formation in Chile

- Stratigraphic range: Pliocene–Early Pleistocene
- Underlies: Quaternary Andean volcanoes
- Overlies: Vizcacha-Cumilao Complex; Cura-Mallín Formation; Estratos de Huichahue; Melipeuco Plutonic Group

Lithology
- Primary: Volcaniclastic rocks, lava

Location
- Region: Araucanía Region
- Country: Chile

Type section
- Named for: Malleco River
- Named by: Suárez & Emparan
- Year defined: 1997

Malleco Formation (Spanish: Formación Malleco) is a geological formation of volcanic origin in the Andes of Araucanía Region (38–39° S), Chile. The formation is made up by volcaniclastic rocks, including tuffs, lahars and lavas of Pliocene–Early Pleistocene age. It is considered equivalent to the Cola de Zorro Formation found further north in Chile and the so-called "Asociación volcánica de la precordillera oriental" located around the upper courses Bío Bío and Aluminé rivers.
