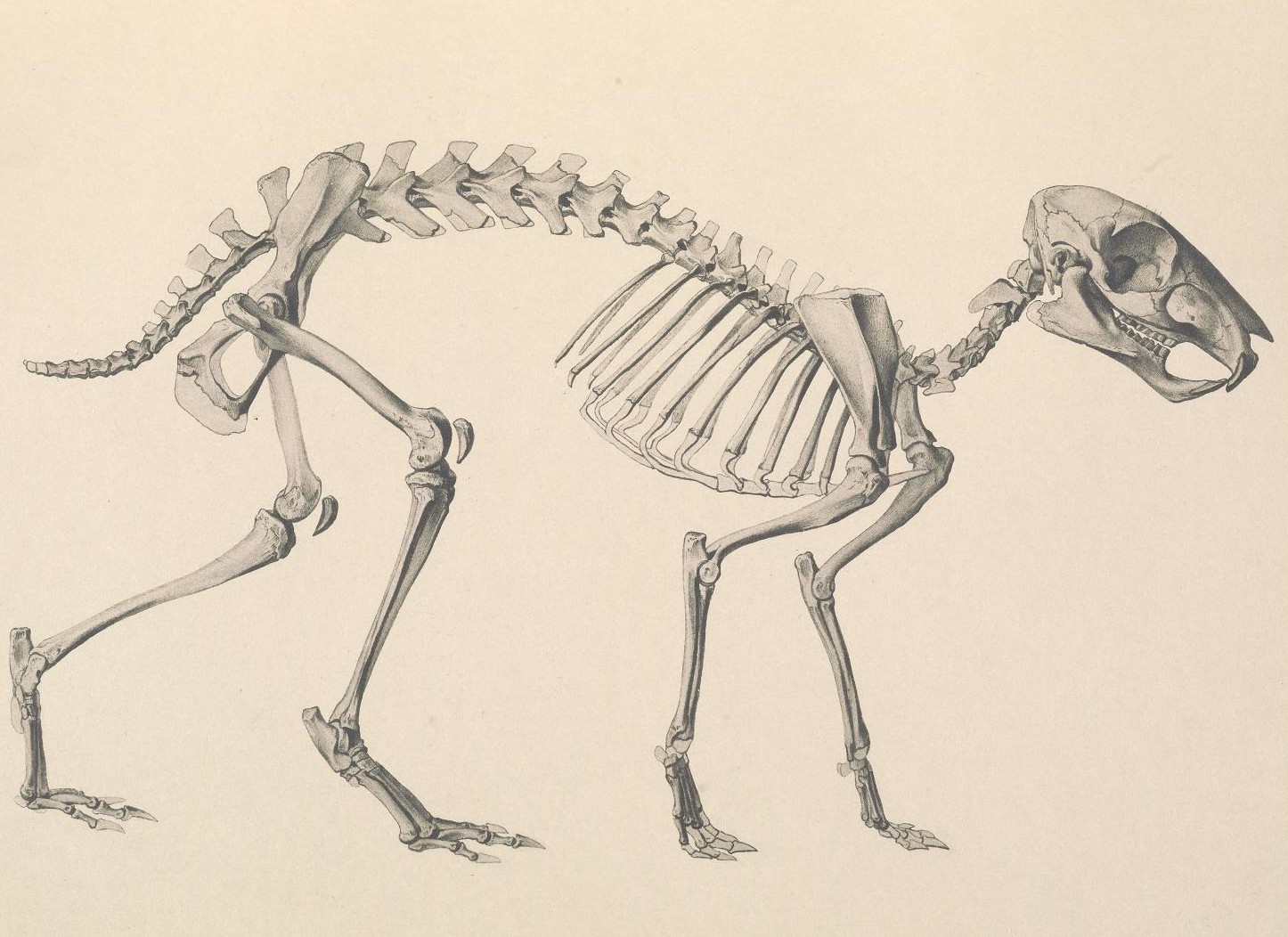
- Skeletal restoration of Eocardia

Scientific classification
- Domain: Eukaryota
- Kingdom: Animalia
- Phylum: Chordata
- Class: Mammalia
- Order: Rodentia
- Superfamily: Cavioidea
- Family: †Eocardiidae; Ameghino 1891

Subfamilies and genera
- †Eocardiinae: †Chubutomys; †Phanomys; †Schistomys; †Eocardia; †Matiamys; †Neophanomys; †Luantinae: †Asteromys; †Luantus

= Eocardiidae =

Eocardiidae Temporal range: Early-Mid Miocene (Colhuehuapian-Friasian) ~21.0–15.5 Ma

Extinct family of rodents

The Eocardiidae are an extinct family of caviomorph rodents from South America. The family is probably ancestral to the living family Caviidae, which includes cavies, maras, and capybaras and their relatives. McKenna and Bell (1997) divided eocardiids into two subfamilies, Luantinae for two of the oldest genera (Asteromys and Luantus) and Eocardiinae for remaining genera. Kramarz (2006) has recommended the abandonment of these subfamilies, as the genera placed in Luantinae appear to represent basal eocardiids, rather than a specialized side branch. The latter hypothesis had been proposed by Wood and Patterson (1959).

Fossils of the family were found in the Colhuehuapian to Friasian Pinturas, Sarmiento, Santa Cruz, Río Jeinemeiní and Collón Curá Formations of Argentina and the Cura-Mallín Group of Chile.
