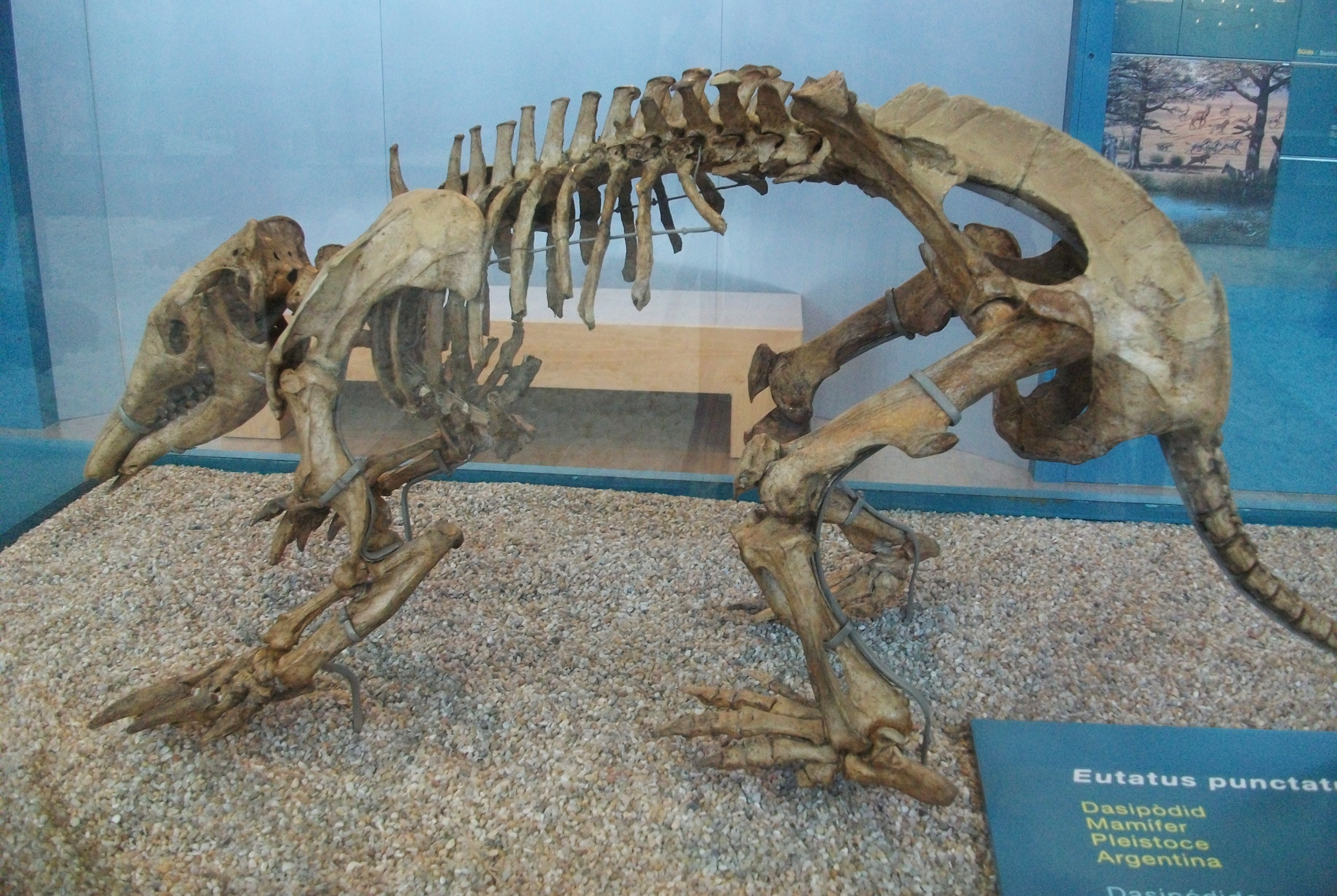
- Eutatus punctatus skeleton
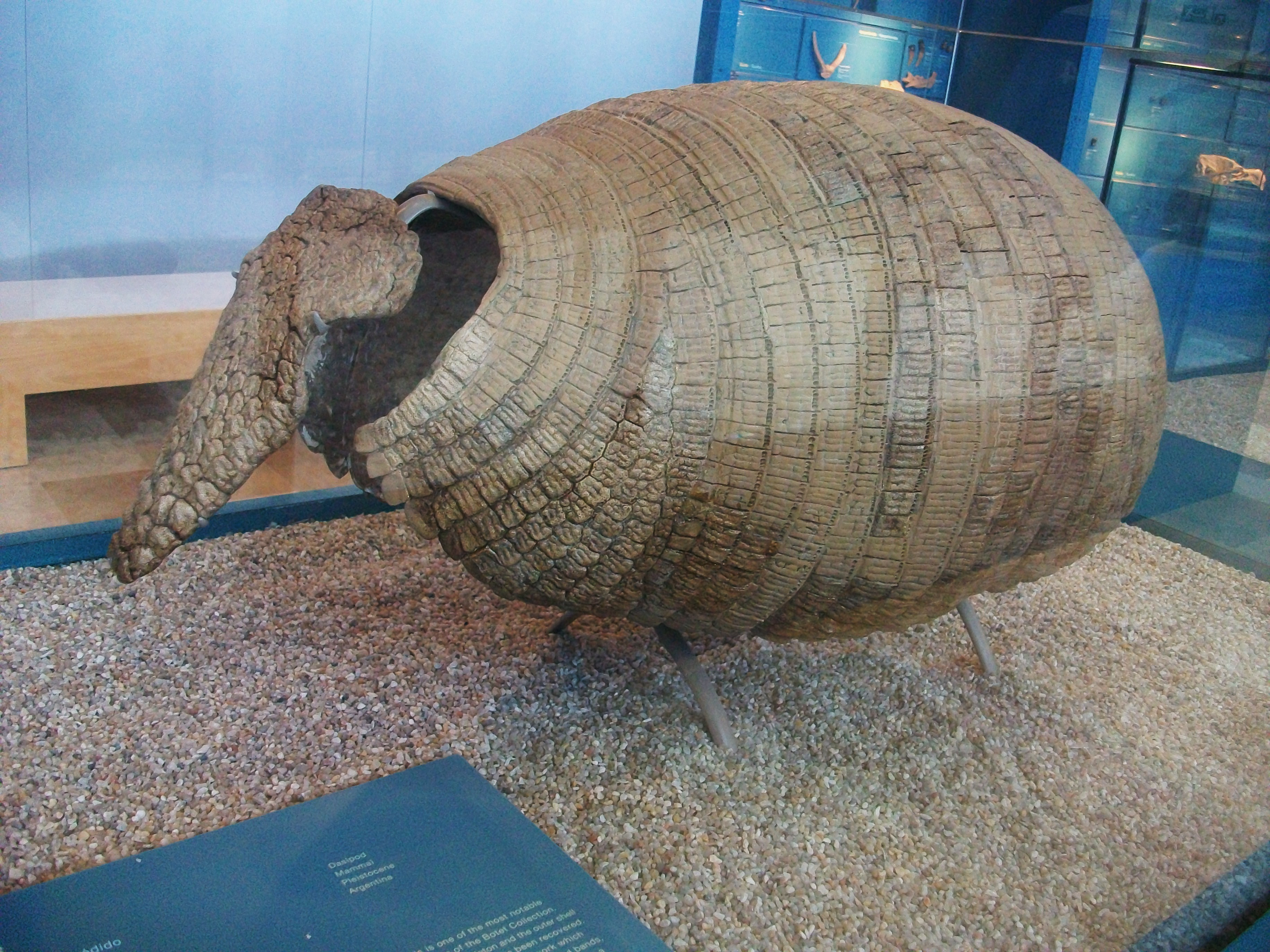
- Eutatus punctatus armour

Scientific classification
- Kingdom: Animalia
- Phylum: Chordata
- Class: Mammalia
- Order: Cingulata
- Family: Chlamyphoridae
- Genus: †Eutatus; Gervais 1867

Species
- E. carinatus Ameghino, 1891; E. crispianii Brambilla & Ibarra, 2017; E. deleo Ameghino, 1891; E. distans Ameghino, 1887; E. lagena Ameghino, 1887; E. pascuali Krmpotic et al., 2009; E. praepampaeus Ameghino, 1904; E. seguini Gervais, 1867

= Eutatus =

Eutatus Temporal range: Early Miocene-Late Pleistocene (Santacrucian-Lujanian) ~17.5–0.012 Ma

Extinct genus of mammals

Eutatus is an extinct genus of large armadillos of the family Chlamyphoridae. It was endemic to South America from the Early Miocene to Late Pleistocene, living from 17.5 Ma-11,000 years ago, with possible survival into the early Holocene (~ 7,500 BP) and existing for approximately 17.49 million years.

== Taxonomy ==
Eutatus was named by Gervais (1867). The type species is E. seguini. It was assigned to Dasypodidae by Carroll (1988).

== Fossil distribution ==
The fossil remains are confined to Argentina and have been found in the Santacrucian Santa Cruz Formation, Ensenadan Miramar Formation, and the Lujanian Luján Formation.

== Palaeobiology ==
The overall masticatory apparatus morphology of Eutatus suggests that it was adapted for browsing. Based on carbon isotope ratios, however, it is thought to have been an herbivore that fed on grasses.

== Gallery ==
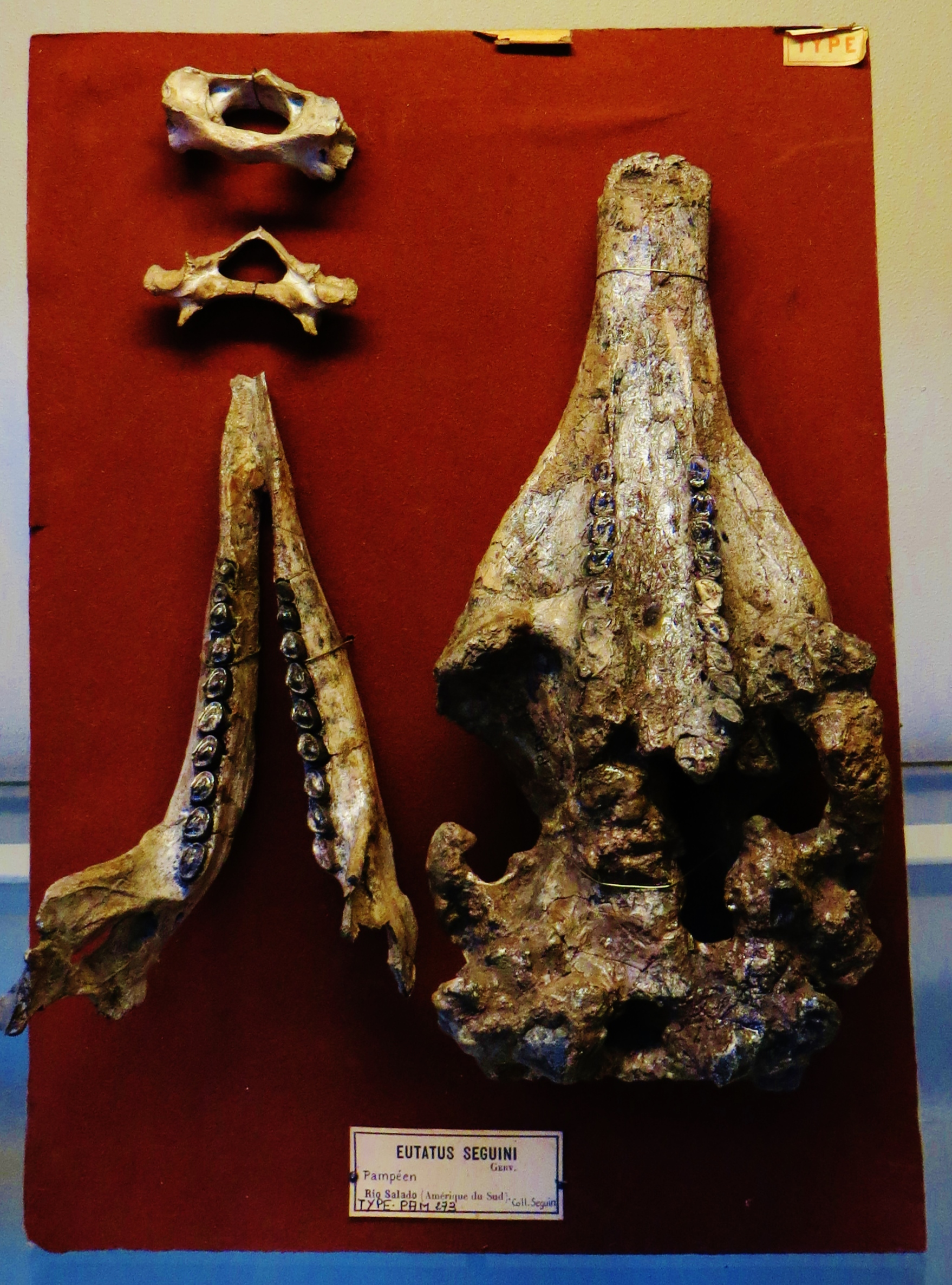
Skull

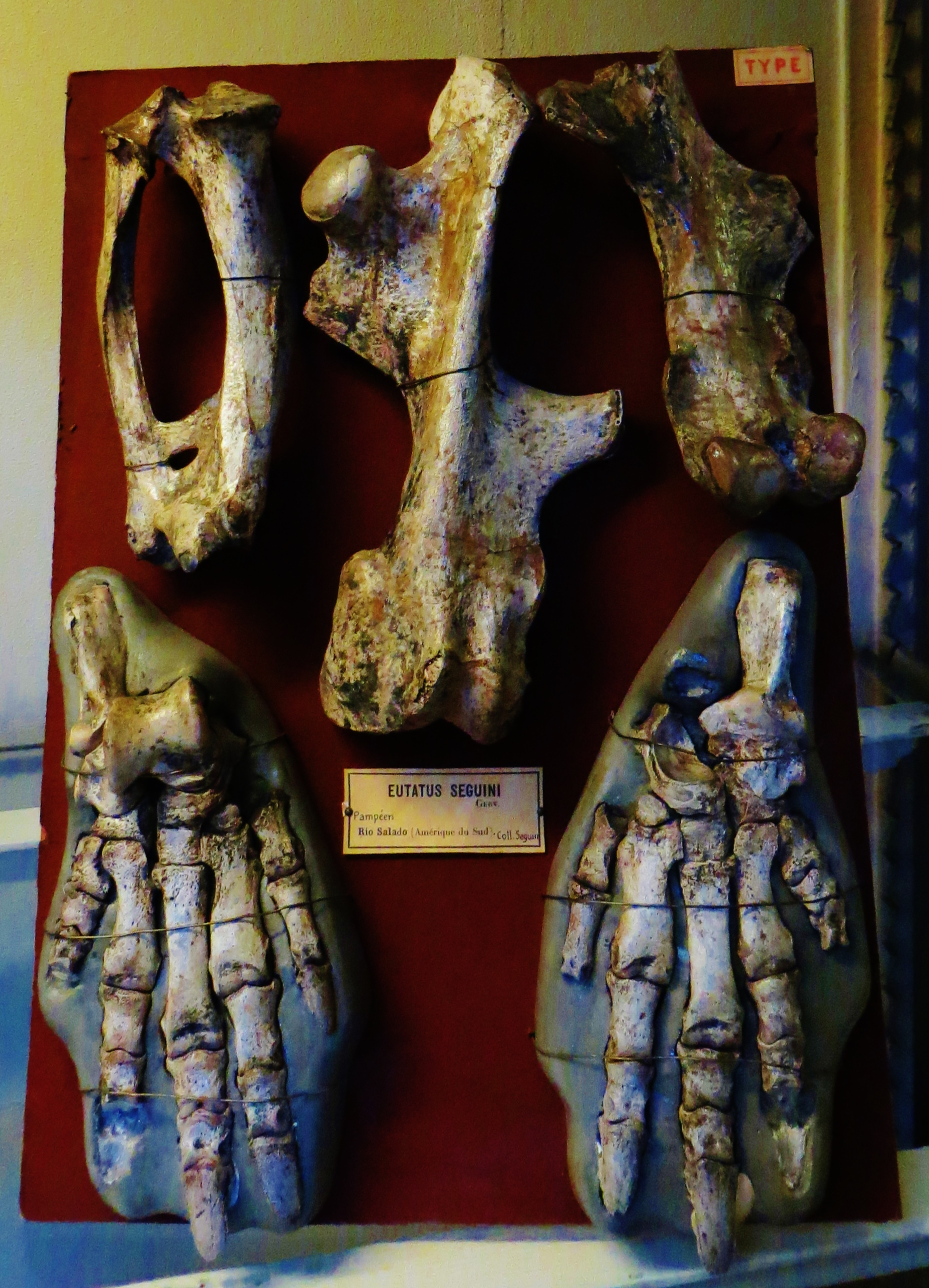
Limbs
