= Erichosaurus =

Erichosaurus Temporal range: Miocene

Scientific classification
- Domain: Eukaryota
- Kingdom: Animalia
- Phylum: Chordata
- Class: Reptilia
- Order: Squamata
- Suborder: Iguania
- Family: Iguanidae
- Genus: †Erichosaurus; Ameghino, 1899

Type species
- †Erichosaurus diminutus Ameghino, 1899

Other species
- E. bombimaxilla Ameghino, 1899; E. debilis Ameghino, 1899

Dubious genus of fossil lizards

Erichosaurus is an extinct genus of iguanid lizard from the Lower Miocene of Argentina. It is known from three species named in 1899 by Argentinian paleontologist Florentino Ameghino, the type species E. diminutus, E. bombimaxilla, and E. debilis, all known from the Santacrucian beds. No images have been published of the type species, and the specimen it was named for is now lost, so it is a nomen dubium. The referred species E. bombimaxilla and E. debilis are not lost, being in the collections of the Museo Argentino de Ciencias Naturales, but they lack distinguishing features and are also dubious.
