= Orthoarthrus =

Orthoarthrus mixtus Temporal range: Miocene (Santacrucian), 18–15.2 Ma

Scientific classification
- Kingdom: Animalia
- Phylum: Chordata
- Class: Mammalia
- Order: incertae sedis
- Genus: †Orthoarthrus Ameghino, 1904
- Species: †O. mixtus

Binomial name
- †Orthoarthrus mixtus Ameghino, 1904

Extinct genus of mammals

Orthoarthrus ("upright joint") is an extinct species of mammal of unknown affinities that lived in Argentina during the Miocene. It was described by prolific Argentine paleontologist Florentino Ameghino in 1904 on the basis of a single left astragalus (under specimen number MLP 69-IX-5-16,) that had been unearthed from the Santacrucian sediments of Santa Cruz, Argentina. Ameghino described it as a species of pangolin closely related to African species of the group, but this came into question by later 20th-century paleontologists, who concluded that it was an indeterminate genus of mammal. The size of the astragalus and its anatomy was described briefly, with a diameter of 30 millimetres (1.2 in) and a distinct furrowed morphology on its ventral face. The species name mixtus ("mixed") is after the anatomy of the astragalus' rugged bottom surface.
