= Parapropalaehoplophorus =

Parapropalaehoplophorus Temporal range: Early-Mid Miocene (Santacrucian-Laventan) ~17.5–11.8 Ma

Scientific classification
- Domain: Eukaryota
- Kingdom: Animalia
- Phylum: Chordata
- Class: Mammalia
- Order: Cingulata
- Family: Chlamyphoridae
- Subfamily: †Glyptodontinae
- Genus: †Parapropalaehoplophorus
- Species: †P. septentrionalis

Binomial name
- †Parapropalaehoplophorus septentrionalis Croft, Flynn & Wyss, 2007

Extinct genus of mammals

Parapropalaehoplophorus is an extinct genus of comparatively small (compared to Glyptodon) species of glyptodont, extinct relatives of the modern armadillo. The sole species, P. septentrionalis, identified in 2007 from the fossilized remains of a specimen found in 2004, weighed approximately 200 pounds and had a shell covered by tiny circular bumps. It lumbered around northern Chile in the Chucal Formation, an area now dominated by the Andes mountain range, some 18 million years ago. Fossils of the glyptodont also have been found in Peru (Ipururo and Pebas Formations).

== Etymology ==
The name of the genus is the result of a chain of derivations from other genera. The name means "near Propalaehoplophorus," which refers to the phylogenetic position of this animal and the fact that these two genera lived in what is now Chile during the same time period (though their fossils have not been found within the same formation). This name is itself derived from Palaehoplophorus, which in turn is derived from Hoplophorus. In each case, a newly discovered fossil animal was named after a previously known one with similar traits.
