= Cariama santacrucensis =

Cariama santacrucensis Temporal range: Middle miocene 17.5–16.3 Ma

Scientific classification
- Domain: Eukaryota
- Kingdom: Animalia
- Phylum: Chordata
- Class: Aves
- Order: Cariamiformes
- Family: Cariamidae
- Genus: Cariama
- Species: †C. santacrucensis

Binomial name
- †Cariama santacrucensis Noriega et al., 2009

Extinct species of bird

Cariama santacrucensis is an extinct species of seriema, which lived during the Early Miocene. The holotype specimen is MPM-PV 3511; the fossil is an incomplete skull from the Puesto Estancia La Costa fossil formation in Southern Santa Cruz Province, Argentina.
