= Argyromanis =

Argyromanis patagonica Temporal range: Miocene (Santacrucian), 18–15.2 Ma

Scientific classification
- Kingdom: Animalia
- Phylum: Chordata
- Class: Mammalia
- Order: incertae sedis
- Genus: †Argyromanis Ameghino, 1904
- Species: †A. patagonica

Binomial name
- †Argyromanis patagonica Ameghino, 1904

Extinct genus of mammals

Argyromanis ("silver spirit"; the root -manis is frequently used in pangolins) is an extinct species of mammal of unknown affinities that lived in Argentina during the Miocene. It was described by prolific Argentine paleontologist Florentino Ameghino in 1904 on the basis of a single left astragalus (under specimen number MACN A-11687) that had been unearthed from the Santacrucian sediments of Santa Cruz, Argentina. Ameghino described it as a species of pangolin, even including this in the genus name's root -manis, after Manidae. The species name patagonica is after the fossil's discovery in Patagonia. However, later analyses of the astragalus have been inconclusive and finds it to be an indeterminate genus of mammal.
