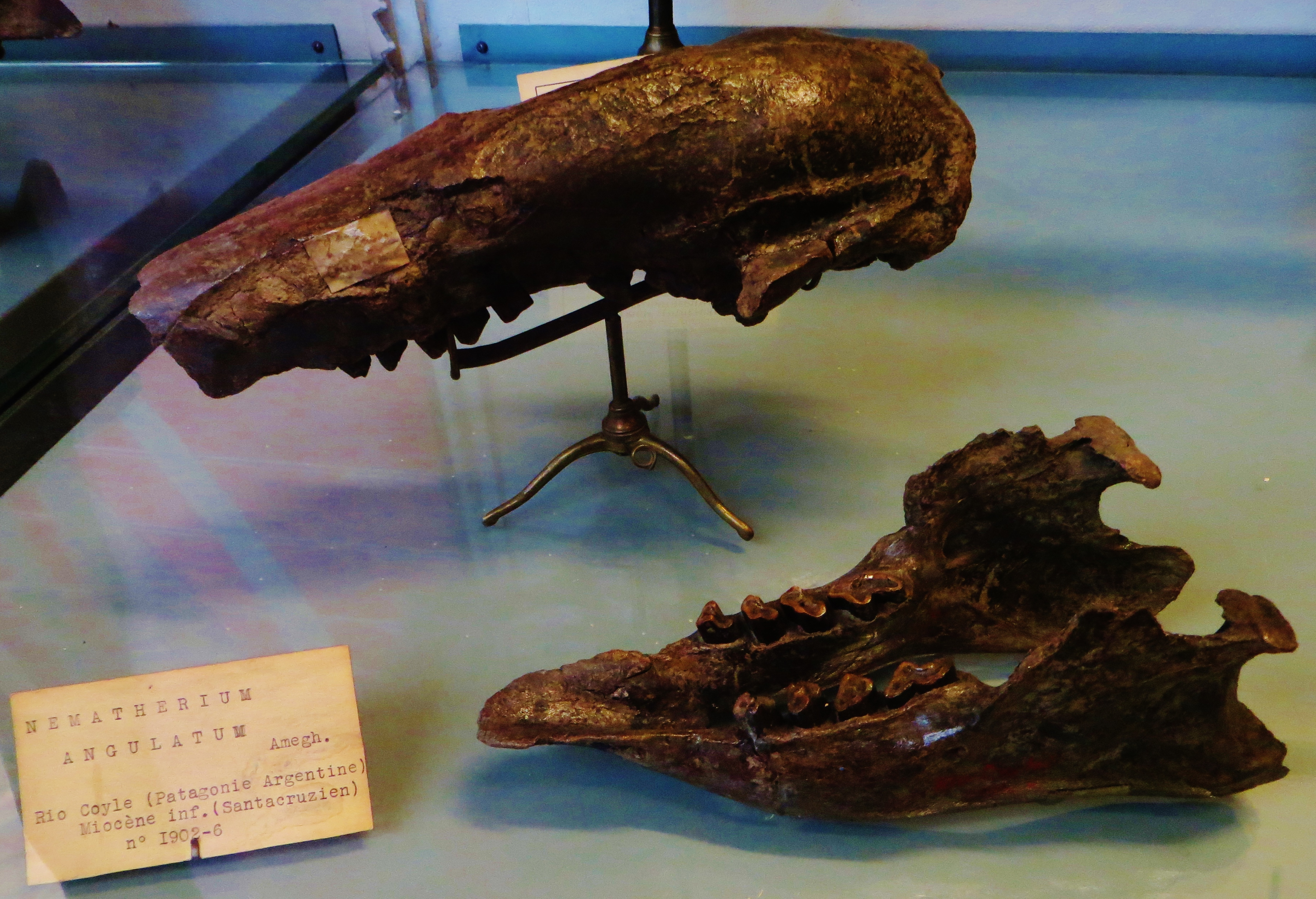
- Nematherium angulatum skull and jaw

Scientific classification
- Kingdom: Animalia
- Phylum: Chordata
- Class: Mammalia
- Order: Pilosa
- Suborder: Folivora
- Superfamily: Mylodontoidea
- Genus: †Nematherium; Ameghino 1887

Type species
- †Nematherium angulatum Ameghino 1887

Other species
- N. birdi Simpson 1941; N. longirostris Ameghino 1891; N. auca Ameghino 1894; N. declivum Ameghino 1894

= Nematherium =

Nematherium Temporal range: Mid Miocene (Santacrucian) ~17.5–16.3 Ma

Extinct genus of ground sloths

Nematherium is an extinct genus of ground sloth belonging to Mylodontoidea, it is either considered to be a member of Mylodontidae or Scelidotheriidae. It lived during the Middle Miocene epoch (Santacrucian). Fossils have been found in the Cura-Mallín Formation of Chile and the Santa Cruz and Sarmiento Formations of Argentina.

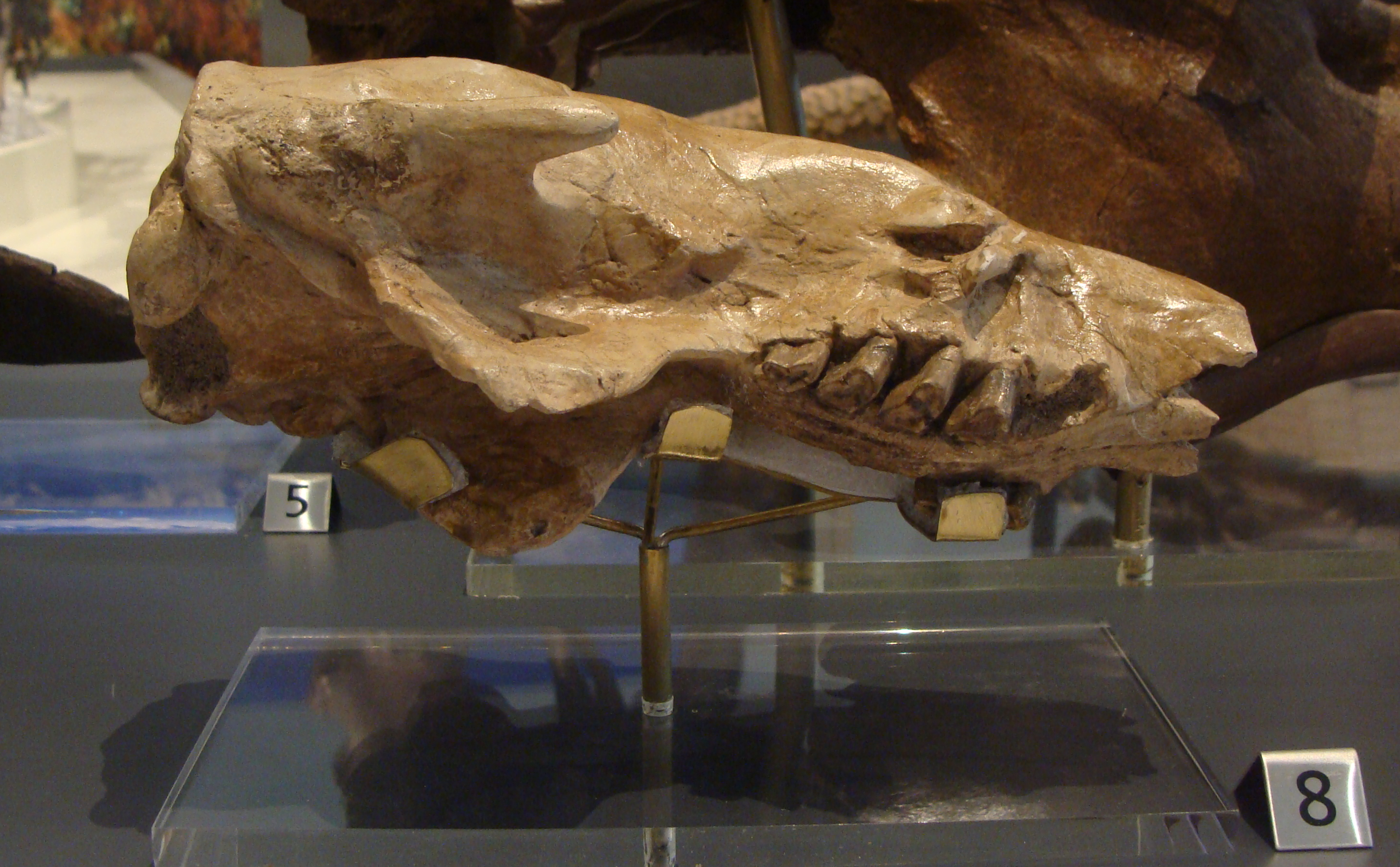
Skull
