= Entoglossus =

The entoglossus (also entoglossum or entoglossal) is an elongated bony or cartilaginous process in lizards and birds that projects from the body of the hyoid apparatus into the tongue.

== Evolution ==
The entoglossum is generally present as a cartilaginous structure in lizards, where it plays a key role in supporting the tongue during prey capture. It is reduced in snakes, and apparently absent in agamids, iguanids, and lacertids. It is enlarged in chameleons.

In birds, the entoglossum develops anterior to the basihyal from paired elements called paraglossals. It is thought to be homologous with the distal end of the ceratohyal.
