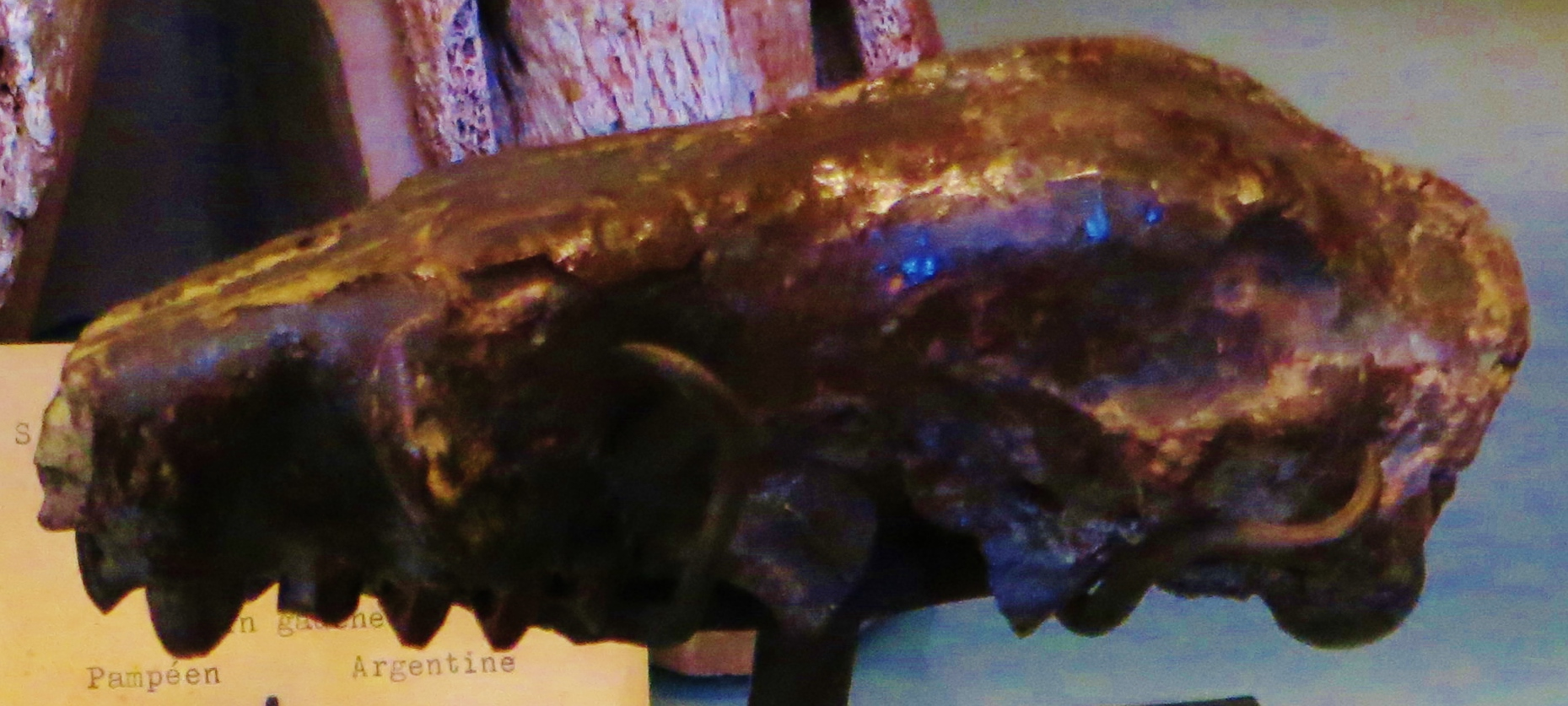
- Skull of Pelecyodon cristatus

Scientific classification
- Kingdom: Animalia
- Phylum: Chordata
- Class: Mammalia
- Order: Pilosa
- Superfamily: Megatherioidea
- Genus: †Pelecyodon; Ameghino 1891

Species
- P. arcuatus Ameghino 1891; P. cristatus Ameghino 1894; P. maximus Ameghino 1891; P. petraeus Ameghino 1891; P. robustus Ameghino 1891

= Pelecyodon =

Pelecyodon Temporal range: Early Miocene (Santacrucian) ~17.5–16.3 Ma

Extinct genus of ground sloths

Pelecyodon is an extinct genus of ground sloths from the Early Miocene (Santacrucian) of South America.

== Distribution ==
Fossils have been found in the Santa Cruz Formation in Argentina. Further remains have been unearthed in layers likely representing the Pinturas Formation.
