= Cola de Zorro Formation =

Geological formation along the Argentina–Chile border

- Stratigraphic range: Pliocene–Early Pleistocene
- Underlies: Quaternary Andean volcanoes

Lithology
- Primary: Volcaniclastic rocks

Location
- Coordinates: 38.0°S 71.6°W
- Region: Araucanía, Bío-Bío & Maule Regions; Neuquén Province
- Country: Chile; Argentina

Type section
- Named by: Suárez & Emparan
- Year defined: 1997
- Cola de Zorro Formation (Chile)

Cola de Zorro Formation (Spanish: Formación Cola de Zorro) is a geological formation cropping out along the Argentina-Chile border and composed of volcano-sedimentary and volcaniclastic rocks. It extends along the Andes between the latitudes of 36 and 39° S.

== Description ==
The formation overlies across an angular unconformity older sedimentary rocks of continental origin as well as dykes and plutons that intruded these sediments. The unconformity has an irregular form attesting to a topography that was flattened out by the deposition of the Cola de Zorro sediments. Cola de Zorro Formation was deposited in Pliocene and Pleistocene times. The formation interdigitates with lavas of old and eroded volcanoes. Lavas of modern volcanoes, like Antuco, unconformably overlies the formations and dykes associated to modern volcanoes intrude it. In some localities the formation is covered by moraines.

The Cola de Zorro Formation is largely undeformed except from some minor tilting caused by block tectonics. The strata of Cola de Zorro Formation are sub-horizontal. The formation is dissected by fluvial and glacial erosion. The formation is made up of tuff, volcanic breccia and volcanic agglomerate. The lavas are made up of andesite, trachyandesite, trachyte, basaltic andesite and basalt. Volcanic rocks of Cola de Zorro Formation belong to two magma series. Most volcanic rocks are part of a calc-alkaline magma series. Trachyandesites and trachytes of the Pino Hachado and Pichachén areas are alkaline.

The southwestern fringes of Cola de Zorro Formation were redefined in 1997 as being part of Malleco Formation by geologists Manuel Suárez and Carlos Emparan.
