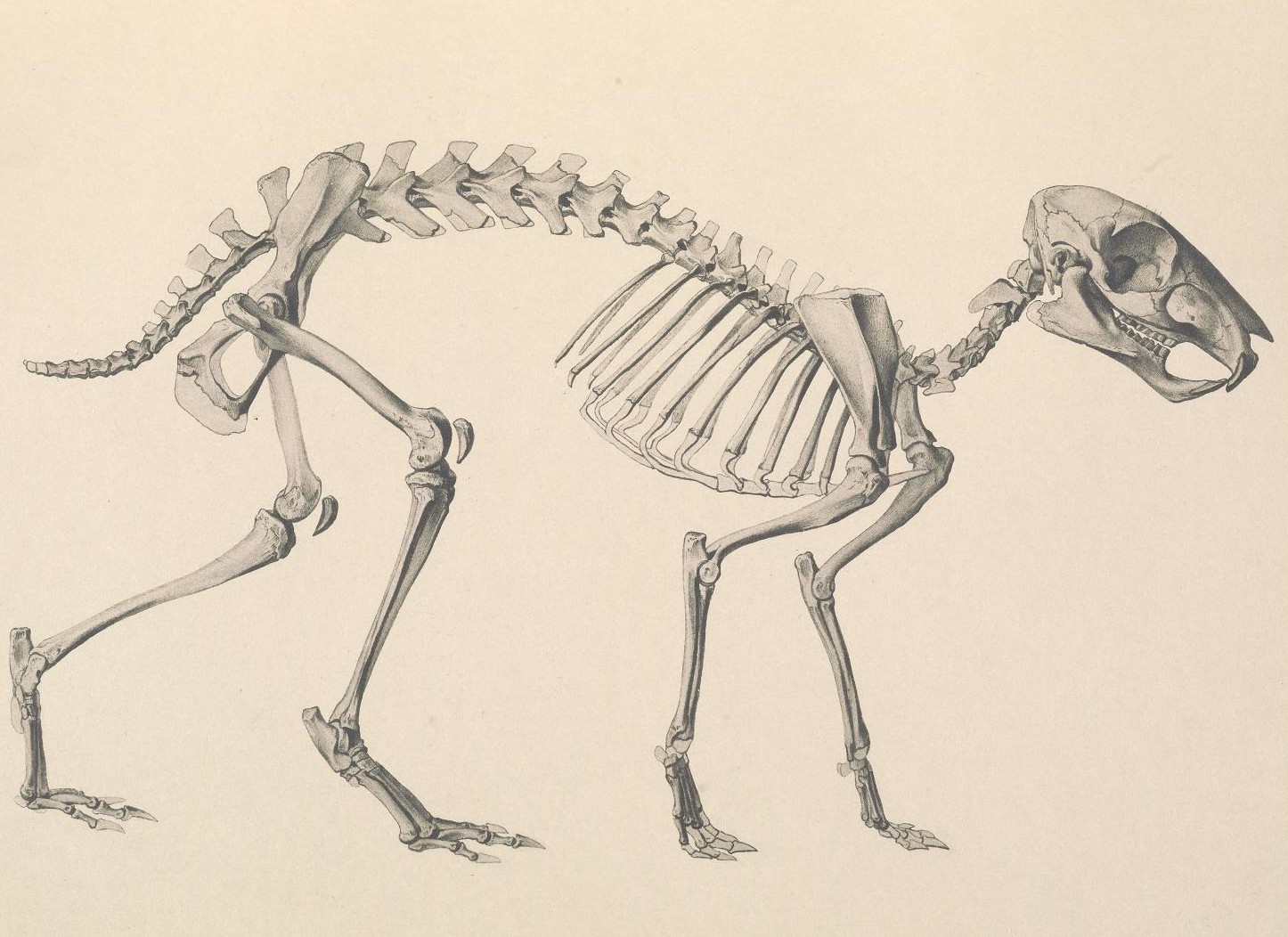
- Skeletal restoration

Scientific classification
- Domain: Eukaryota
- Kingdom: Animalia
- Phylum: Chordata
- Class: Mammalia
- Order: Rodentia
- Family: †Eocardiidae
- Genus: †Eocardia; Ameghino 1887

= Eocardia =

Eocardia Temporal range: Early-Middle Miocene (Santacrucian) ~17.5–16.3 Ma

Extinct genus of mammals from Argentina

Eocardia is an extinct genus of rodent from the Early to Middle Miocene of Argentina (Santa Cruz Formation) and Chile, South America. The 30 centimetres (12 in) long creature was related to guinea pigs and the capybara.
