= Cura-Mallín Group =

- Stratigraphic range: Upper Oligocene–Middle Miocene; Colhuehuapian-Laventan (SALMA)
- Type: Geological group
- Unit of: Cura-Mallín Basin; Neuquén Basin
- Sub-units: Various schemes, see text
- Underlies: Cajón Negro Formation; Trapa Trapa Formation
- Overlies: Cretaceous granitoids Jurassic sediments
- Thickness: >1,800 m (5,900 ft)

Lithology
- Primary: Sandstone, siltstone, shale, breccia, andesite lava
- Other: Grainstone

Location
- Coordinates: 37.7°S 71.2°W
- Approximate paleocoordinates: 38.3°S 66.4°W
- Region: Araucanía & Bío Bío Regions; Neuquén Province
- Country: Chile; Argentina

Type section
- Named for: Mallín
- Cura-Mallín Group (Chile)

Cura-Mallín Group (Spanish: Grupo Cura-Mallín) is a heterogeneous group of volcano-sedimentary formations of Oligocene-Miocene age, Colhuehuapian to Laventan in the SALMA classification, in south-central Chile and nearby parts of Argentina. The sediments belonging to the group were deposited in a lacustrine environment and alongside rivers in an intra-arc basin. Southeast of Laguna del Laja Cura-Mallín Group has a thickness of more than 1,800 metres (5,900 ft). The sediments making up the group deposited in an interval between 22 and 8 million years ago.

The outcrops of Cura-Mallín Group are found along a north–south elongate area. The group is considered an equivalent of Abanico Formation, either as a southern extension or as a lateral equivalent of that formation.

== Stratigraphy and members ==
Various subdivision schemes have been proposed for the Cura-Mallín unit since the 1980s. In 1983, Niemeyer and Muñoz identified two members; the Río Queuco Member, overlain by the Malla Malla Member. In two publications published in 1995 and 1997, Suárez and Emperan divided Cura-Mallín Formation in two diachronous members: Guapitrío and Río Pedregoso. Utgé et al. (2009) proposed instead a subdivision into an upper Arroyo Pincheira Member and a lower Lumabia Member.

In a 2017 revision the Cura-Mallín, formerly a formation, was redefined as a group given its great variety of lithologies. The Guapitrío, Río Pedregoso members of Suárez and Emperan became formations according to this scheme. In addition the new scheme include the Mitrauquén Formation that overlies both the Guapitrío and Río Pedregoso Formations as a third formation in the group.

== Cura-Mallín Basin ==
A number of geologists consider Cura-Mallín Basin, the sedimentary basin where the formation deposited, an extensional basin that developed on the western fringes of the much larger Neuquén Basin, while others consider it a back-arc basin. In the Upper Miocene the sedimentary basin was inverted. Relative to other nearby sedimentary basins of Miocene and Oligocene age Cura-Mallín Basin has been more researched.

== Fossil content ==
The group contains abundant mammal fossils including bony fishes, birds and mammals such as rodents, marsupials, Mylodontidaes and Notoungulatas.

Group	Fossils	Notes
Mammals	Heteropsomyinae (aff. Acarechimys) sp., Dasyproctidae (aff. Alloiomys) sp., Prolagostomus sp., Caviomorpha indet., Dasypodidae indet., Typotheria indet.	
Mammals	Paedotherium minor, Acarechimys sp., aff. Alloiomys sp., ?Hegetotherium sp., aff. Incamys sp., Luantus sp., Maruchito sp., Prostichomys sp., Protacaremys sp., cf. Protypotherium sp., Sipalocyon sp., Abderitidae indet., Astrapotheria indet., Astrapotheriidae indet., Caviomorpha indet., Dasypodidae indet., Eocardiidae indet., Hegetotheriinae indet., Interatheriinae indet., Pachyrukhinae indet., Toxodontidae indet., Typotheria indet.	
Mammals	Colpodon antucoensis, Acarechimys sp., Luantus sp., Protacaremys sp., Protypotherium sp., Sipalocyon sp., Echimyidae indet.	
Fishes	Nematogenys cuivi	

== Economic geology ==
The proximity of the Cura-Mallín Group to the stratovolcanoes of Tolhuaca and Lonquimay has made it a reservoir of geothermal energy of interest. Of all units the Rucañanco Member of Guapitrio Formation has been judged to have the most promising reservoir potential.
