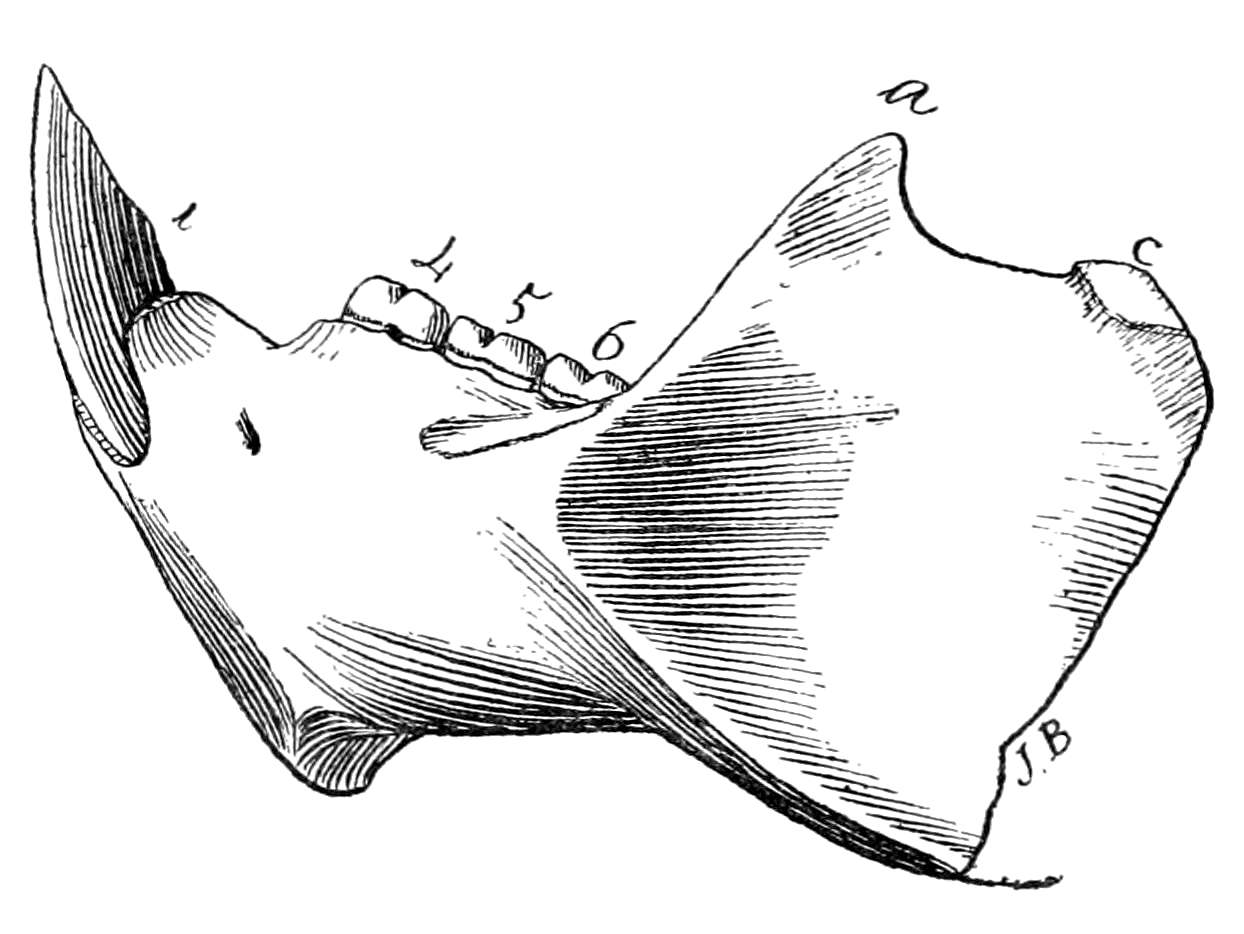

Scientific classification
- Kingdom: Animalia
- Phylum: Chordata
- Class: Mammalia
- Order: Rodentia
- Parvorder: Caviomorpha
- Genus: †Steiromys; Ameghino, 1887

Type species
- Steiromys detentus Ameghino, 1887

Other species
- Steiromys duplicatus Ameghino, 1887 Steiromys intermedius Scott, 1905 Steiromys principalis Ameghino, 1901 Steiromys pseudonectus Bordas, 1939 Steiromys segregatus Ameghino, 1902

= Steiromys =

Steiromys Temporal range: Miocene

Extinct genus of caviomorph rodent

Steiromys is an extinct genus of caviomorph rodent that lived in South America during the Miocene epoch.

== Taxonomy ==
Originally, the species Eosteiromys annectens was classified as a member of the genus Steiromys. However, detailed taxonomic study has moved the species to the genus Eosteiromys.

== Palaeobiology ==
=== Locomotion ===
The foot morphology of Steiromys suggests it may have been scansorial.
