= Luantus =

Luantus Temporal range: Miocene

Scientific classification
- Kingdom: Animalia
- Phylum: Chordata
- Class: Mammalia
- Order: Rodentia
- Superfamily: Cavioidea
- Genus: †Luantus; Ameghino, 1899

Type species
- Luantus propheticus Ameghino, 1899

Other species
- Luantus initialis Ameghino, 1902; Luantus toldensis Kramarz, 2006; Luantus minor Pérez et al., 2010; Luantus sompallwei Solorzano et al., 2020; Luantus silbamanta Arnal et al., 2020

Extinct genus of caviomorph rodent

Luantus is an extinct genus of caviomorph rodent that lived in South America during the Miocene epoch.

== Distribution ==
Endemic to Argentina were the species Luantus initialis, Luantus propheticus, and Luantus toldensis. Luantus sompallwei inhabited Chile exclusively, while Luantus minor is known from both Argentina and Chile. Luantus silbamanta was endemic to Peru.
