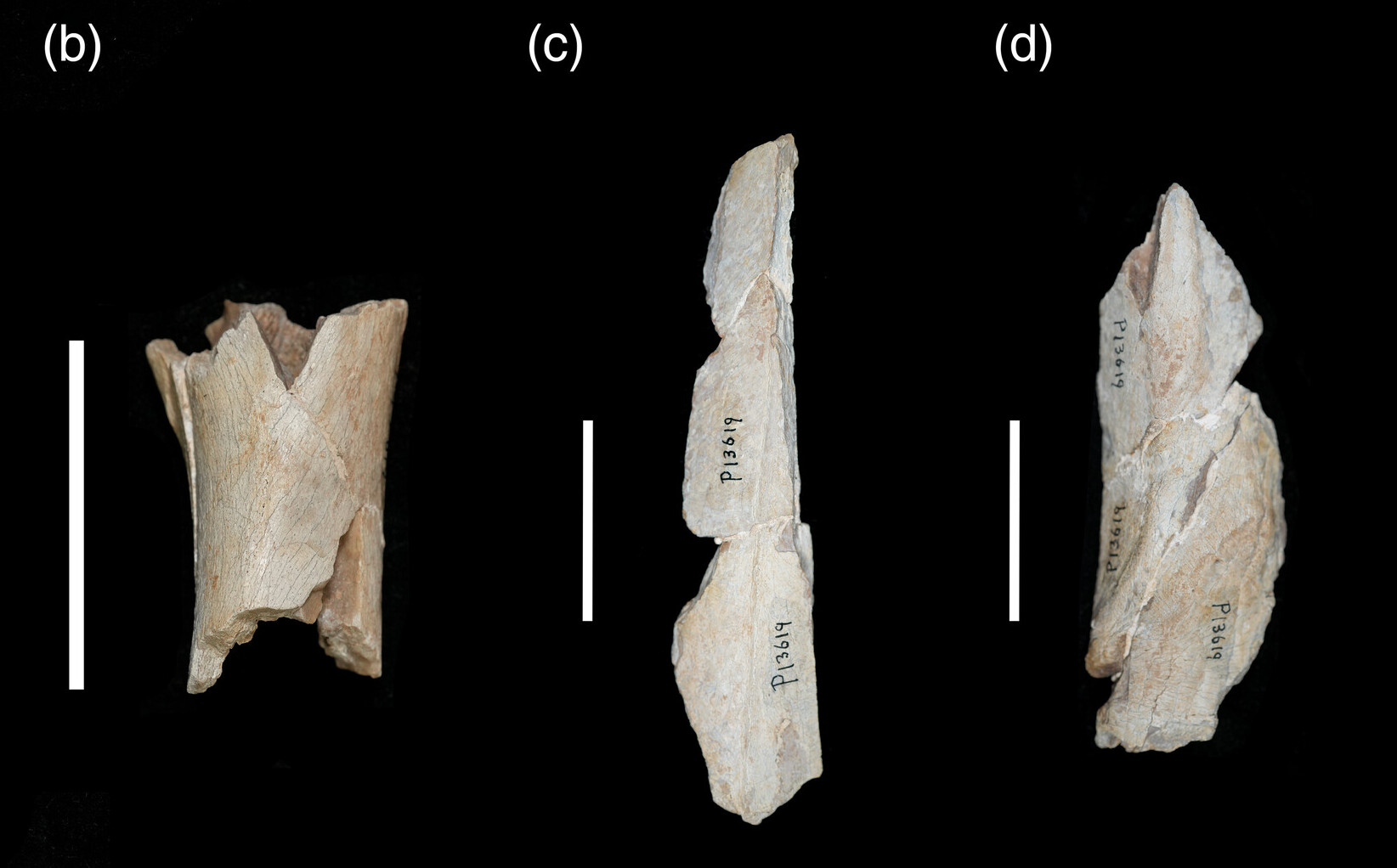
- Tarsometatarsus (a), tibiotarsus (b), and femur (c) fragments of FMNH P 1361, an assigned specimen of Physornis

Scientific classification
- Kingdom: Animalia
- Phylum: Chordata
- Class: Aves
- Order: Cariamiformes
- Family: †Phorusrhacidae
- Genus: †Physornis; Ameghino, 1895

Type species
- †Physornis fortis Ameghino, 1895

Synonyms
- †Aucornis eurhynchus Ameghino, 1898; †Aucornis solidus? Ameghino, 1898 (species inquirenda)

= Physornis =

Physornis Temporal range: Paleogene-Neogene (Oligocene-Miocene), 29–21 Ma

Extinct genus of birds

Physornis ("bellowed bird") is an extinct genus of giant flightless predatory birds of the family Phorusrhacidae or "terror birds" that lived during the Oligocene epoch of the Paleogene in what is now Argentina. It was scientifically described by Argentine paleontologist Florentino Ameghino in 1895 on the basis of a single, incomplete mandible (lower jaw) that was found in rock layers from the Deseadan SALMA (a series of fauna based geologic ages) near the Deseado River, Santa Cruz Province. This fragment was largely the only material known until the early 20th century, when expeditions by the Field Museum and Amherst College to Patagonia recovered many new fossils. However, Physornis remains very poorly known. In 1982, another species of Physornis, P. brasiliensis, was named based on a nearly complete skeleton found in São Paulo, Brazil. It is now in its own genus, Paraphysornis.

Physornis is among the largest phoursrhacids known. Based on its relatives, it may have been 2 meters (6 feet 7 inches) tall at the head. Its mandible is wide, deep, and relatively large, with one specimen measuring 15 centimetres (5.9 in) in preserved length. The tarsometatarsus is similarly stocky, with a giant, flat dorsal (top) face (the area where the tarsometatarsus articulates with the tibiotarsus). It is one of two named physornithines, a group of giant phorusrhacids that lived in the Oligocene of South America, the only other being Paraphysornis. Both genera were previously classified in the clade Brontornithinae, although recent study suggests that Brontornis itself is an anseriform. The histology of Physornis' leg bones indicate that it had an exponential growth pattern without spurts, just like in other phorusrhacids. Fossils of Physornis have exclusively been recovered from Deseadan deposits in Santa Cruz and Chubut Provinces. During the Oligocene, megaherbivores like the South American native ungulates Parastrapotherium and Pyrotherium, carnivores like the marsupial Australohyaena and phorusrhacid Psilopterus, and small herbivores like the notoungulate Archaeohyrax lived in the region.

== History and taxonomy ==
=== Initial discovery ===
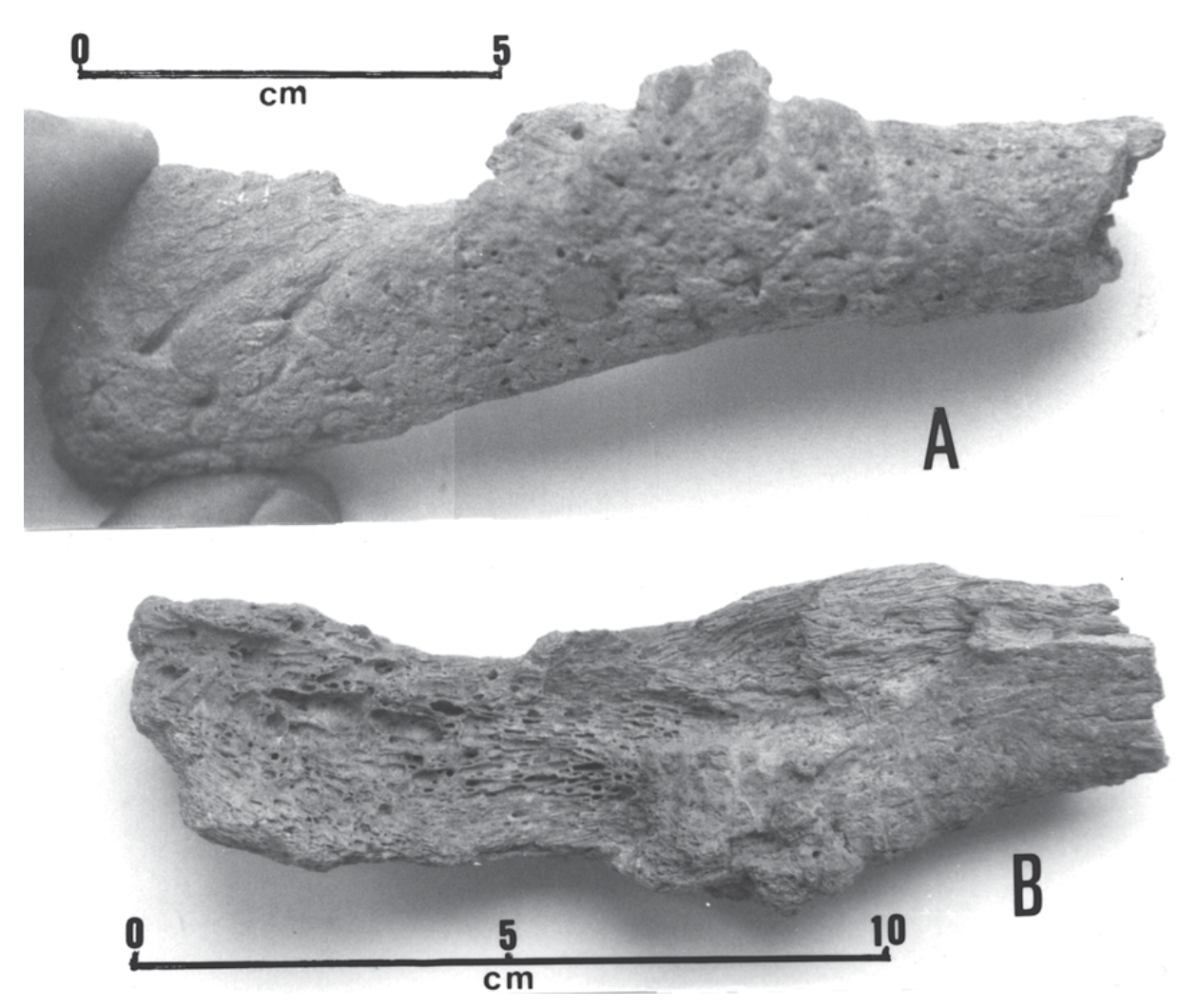
The holotype (name-bearing) specimen (BMNH-A583) of P. fortis

Fossils assigned to Physornis were first discovered in the "Pyrotherium beds" of Puerto Deseado near the Deseado River, eastern Santa Cruz Province, Argentina by crews working for Argentine paleontologist Florentino Ameghino. These rock layers derive from the early Oligocene-aged Deseado Formation, which corresponds to the Deseadan SALMA (South American Land Mammal Ages; a series of fauna-based geological ages). It is among the oldest known confirmed phorusrhacids. Only a single fossil, a fragment of the mandibular symphysis (the area where the mandibulae (lower jaws) meet) and attached portion of the right mandible, was found.

In 1895, Ameghino scientifically described the specimen and assigned it to a new genus and species of phorusrhacid bird, which he dubbed Physornis fortis. The generic name is a combination of the Greek roots φύσια (physero) meaning "bellows" and ὄρνις (ornis) meaning "bird". This specimen was kept in Ameghino's personal collection until 1895 or 1896, when Ameghino sold it and several other Argentine bird fossils to the Natural History Museum, London. There, the specimen was deposited under catalog number BMNH-A583. The type specimen of Physornis fortis is very fragmentary and besides the type symphysis has virtually no other characteristics. As a result, Physornis' validity has historically come into question.

=== Later discoveries ===
During the late 19th and early 20th centuries, American institutions and museums began conducting their own expeditions to Neogene strata in Argentina. In 1911, Amherst College mounted an expedition to Sarmiento Formation deposits in Chubut Province, Argentina. This venture, led by American paleontologist Frederic Brewster Loomis, unearthed a large, isolated right femur (thighbone) in Puesto Almendra that he assigned to Physornis in 1914. He did this based on its large size and similarity to Phorusrhacos', a phorusrhacid known from the Miocene. Loomis also noted the fragmentary nature of the holotype, stating it may be synonymous with Phorusrhacos, but opted to keep the two distinct. In 1922, the Field Museum launched the Captain Marshall Field Expeditions to fossiliferous outcrops in Argentina and Bolivia. This included to Cabeza Blanca, an outcrop of the Sarmiento Formation, Chubut Province, where American paleontologist George F. Sternberg discovered an associated specimen including a mandibular symphysis, a quadratojugal (cheekbone) fragment, atlas (the first cervical vertebra), vertebra fragments, and pedal phalanges (which was deposited at the Field Museum under specimen number FM-P13340) and a mandible fragment, femur, tibiotarsus, and tarsometatarsus (FM-P13619). These specimens were later assigned to Physornis.

In 1941, American ornithologist Bryan Patterson stated that, after an in person examination, Physornis' holotype was likely not avian. Instead, he speculated that it could be a shard from the iliac crest of a giant mammal like Parastrapotherium or Pyrotherium. He provisionally considered it a nomen dubium. In contrast, studies like by American paleontologist Pierce Brodkorb (1967) argued that it was actually valid, though did not go into extensive detail. Upon reexamination, a 2003 article by Brazilian paleontologists Herculano Alvarenga and Elizabeth Höfling found that it was valid, although extremely fragmentary. They stated it was a close relative of the other phorusrhacids Paraphysornis and Brontornis, though the latter is now classified as a galliform.

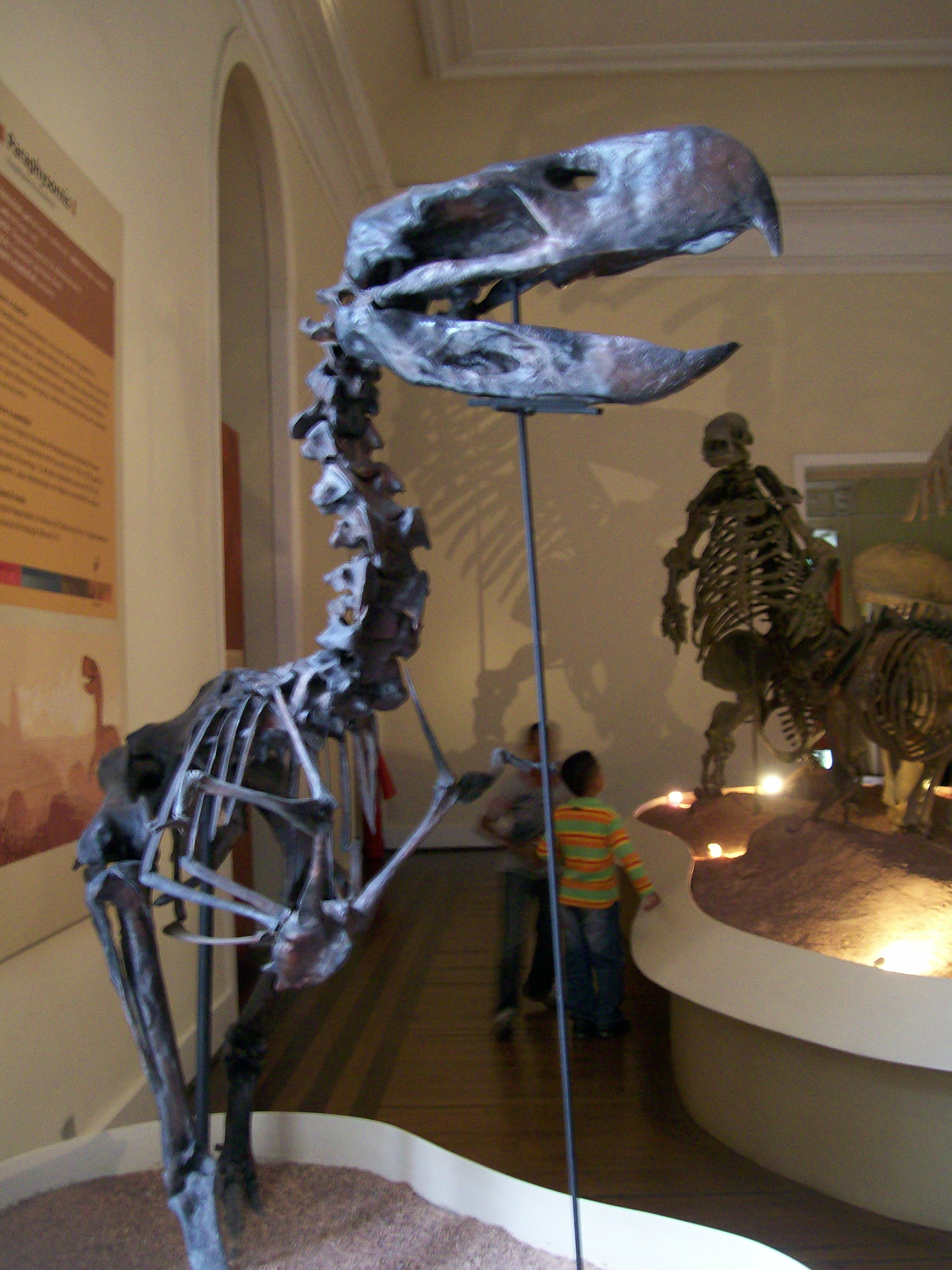
Skeleton of Paraphysornis brasiliensis, a species originally placed in Physornis

=== Synonyms and other species ===
- In 1898, Ameghino dubbed another phorusrhacid genus and species, Aucornis eurhynchus, on the basis of an incomplete mandibular symphysis, the proximal (towards body) end of a tarsometatarsus, and three pedal phalanges (toe bones) that had been found in "Cretaceous" Patagonian strata in Santa Cruz Province. However, these fossils come from the Oligocene-aged Deseado Formation instead. Due to similarities in their symphysis morphology, Brodkorb (1967) and several other studies have considered it a synonym of P. fortis. The associated nature of these remains allowed for the identification of several postcranial elements of Physornis, including another tarsometatarsus.
- In 1899, Ameghino described another phorusrhacid from the "Cretaceous" of Patagonia, Aucornis solidus, on the proximal end of a pedal phalanx from the third toe. It too comes from the Deseado Formation. Although Brodkorb (1967) considered it a synonym of P. fortis, Alvarenga and Höfling (2003) opted to classify it as a species inquirenda because it could be a synonym of Andrewsornis as well. However, in 2007 Argentine paleontologist Federico Agnolín labeled it a nomen dubium instead.
- In 1982, Alvarenga named a new species of Physornis, Physornis brasiliensis, based on a 75% complete skeleton from the Upper Oligocene-Lower Miocene layers of São Paulo, Brazil. In 1993, Alvarenga came to the conclusion that it was actually its own genus, which he named Paraphysornis.

== Description ==
Due to its fragmentary, the size of Physornis is difficult to ascertain. Early estimates by Ameghino theorized it was twice the size of an African ostrich, which can reach over 1.9 meters (6 feet 3 inches) tall and weigh up to 120 kilograms (260 lb). However, more recent study by Alvarenga and Höfling estimated it to have been over 2 meters (6 feet 7 inches) tall and around the size of Brontornis. At the time, Brontornis which was thought to have measured 2.8 meters (9 feet 2 inches) in maximum height and 350–400 kilograms (770–880 pounds) in mass. The quadratojugal, atlas, and proximal end of the tarsometatarsus are slightly larger in Physornis than in Paraphysornis, a taxon that measured possibly 2.4 meters (7 feet 10 inches) tall and weighed 180 kilograms (400 lb). Overall, it had a stockier, more giant build with a shorter, thicker tarsometatarsus and proportionally shorter, wider, and taller mandibular symphysis than other phorusrhacids. This is characteristic of Physornithinae, which features some of the largest members of the clade.

=== Anatomy ===
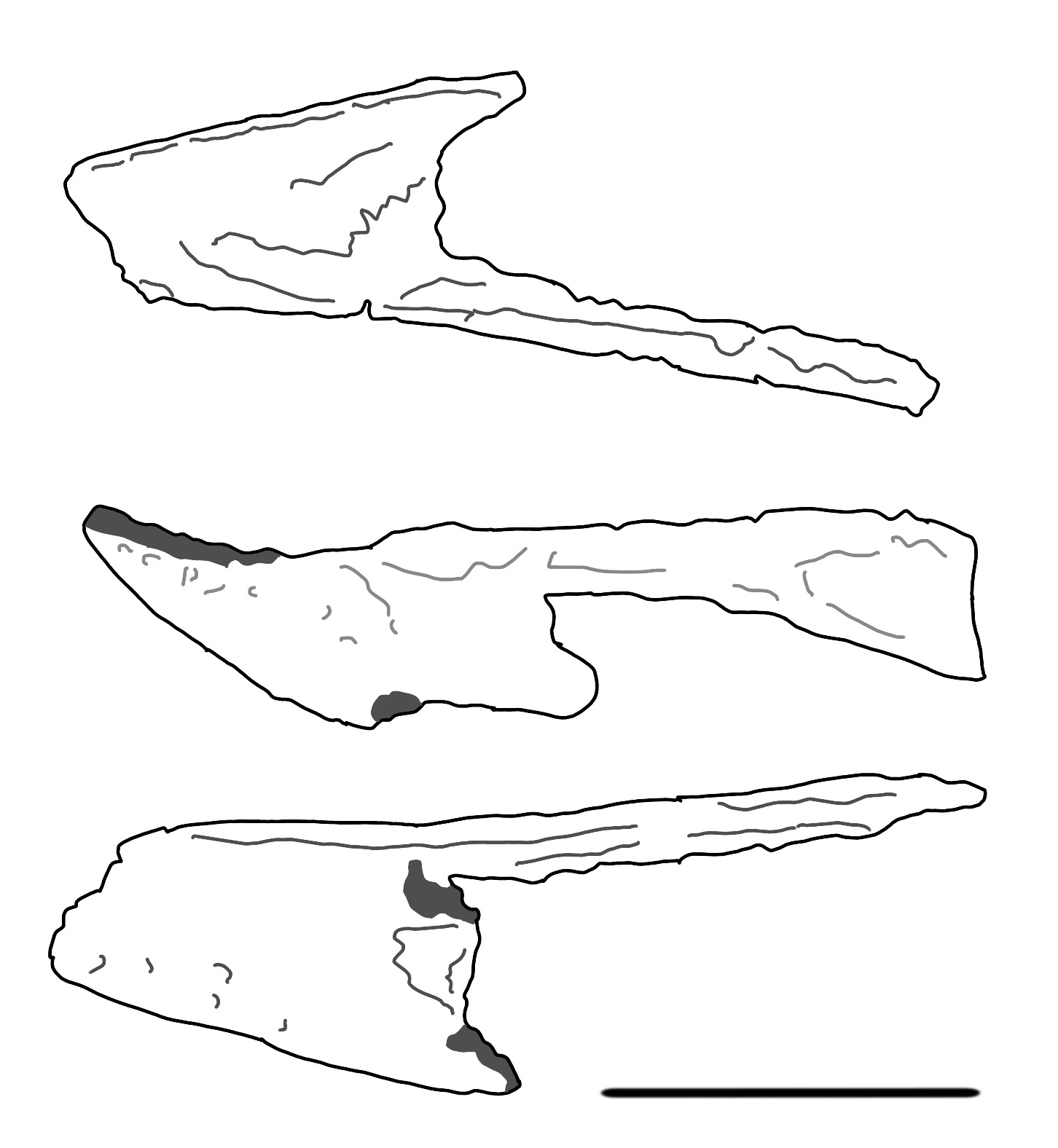
Mandible (lower jaw) of FM13340 in dorsal (a), lateral (b), and ventral (c) views

In his original description, Ameghino differentiated Physornis from Phorusrhacos by stating that the former had a more convex mandibular surface. The holotype fragment measures 150 millimetres (5.9 in) in preserved length, leading him to conclude that it was about the same size as Phorusrhacos. In contrast to those of Phorusrhacos, the branches of the mandibles are further apart from the median and suggest that the skull has a wider base. Additionally, the symphysis is constricted and wide with a flat ventral (bottom) side. This trait is diagnostic (distinguishes a species from others) of the taxon, as taxa like Paraphysornis bear a convex ventral mandibular face. Individual variation has been observed in the symphyses: specimen FM-P13340 bears a flat dorsal (top) symphyseal surface, meanwhile FM-P13619 has a longitudinal channel (a raised portion of bone) that runs the length of the bone.

A femur assigned by Loomis (1914) is very large, with a subcylindrical shaft in cross-sectional view. The distal (away from body) end of the femur is enlarged with flattened condyles (shallow areas of articulation for other bones). Above these condyles on the posterior face of the bone is a giant, deep fossa (a depression in bone). A similar fossa is found on the anterior side, extending from a low marginal ridge which fades with the rest of the bone in a proximal (towards body) direction. The tarsometarsus is only represented by the proximal end, though it displays unique traits such as a quadrangular later cotyl (an extension of bone that articulates with the condyles) and a short, widened dorsal face. The lateral margin of the hipotarsus (a bony process on the posterior side of the tarsometatarsus) has a prominent crest on its posterior (back) face, unlike in Brontornis and Paraphysornis.

== Classification ==
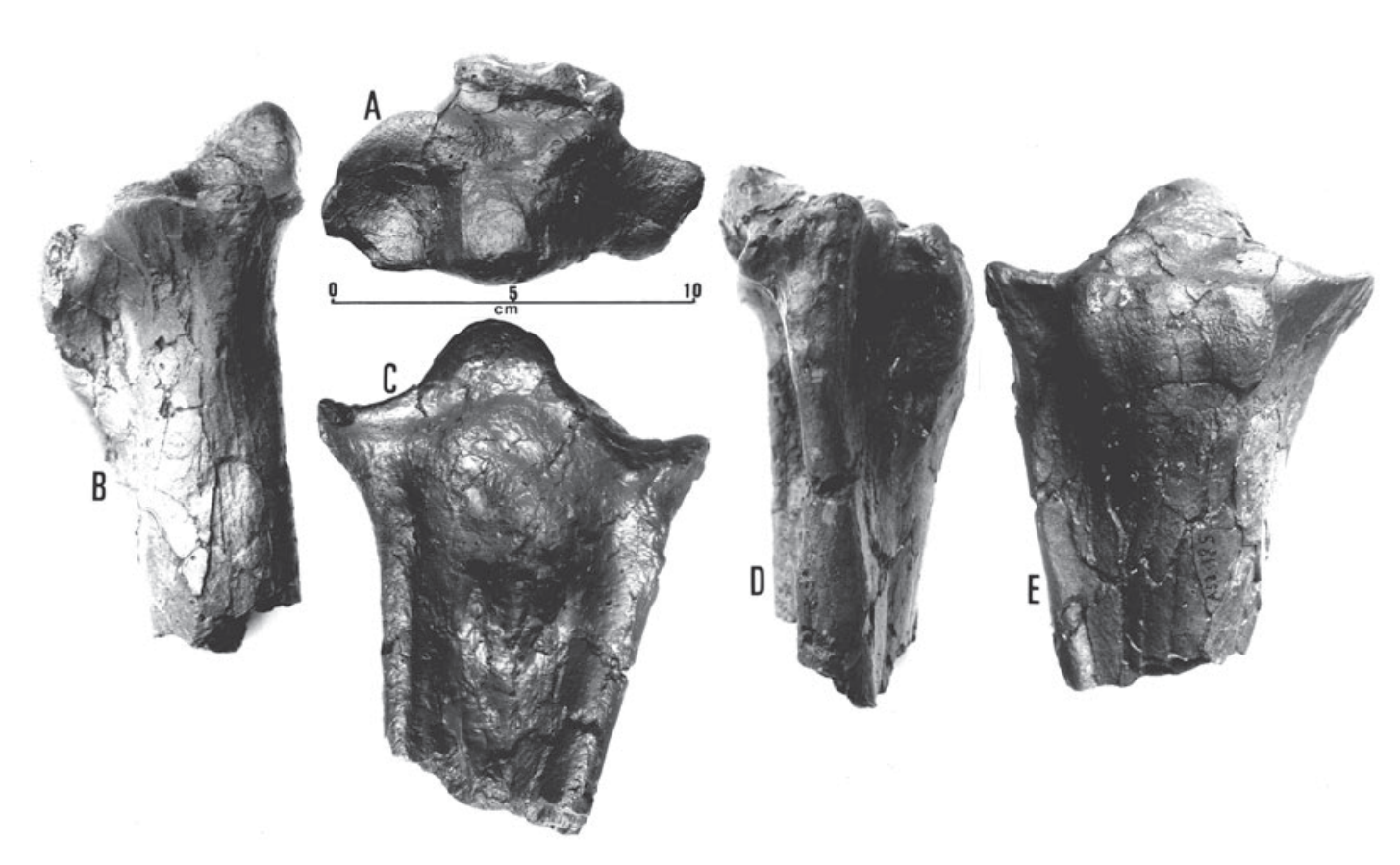
The proximal (towards body) end of a tarsometatarsus

Physornis is classified in the family Phorusrhacidae, a group of flightless, carnivorous cariamiform birds that existed during the Paleogene, Neogene, and Quaternary in the Americas. In 1895, Ameghino classified Phorusrhacos and Tolmodus (now Patagornis) together with Physornis in Phorusrhacidae, an assessment that later research has supported. This group is diverse, including small psilopterines like Psilopterus and Eschatornis, medium-sized patagornithines like Patagornis and Andrewsornis, and the giant phorusrhacines Devincenzia, Kelenken, and Titanis. Physornis and Paraphysornis are often placed in their own subfamily, Physornithinae, though it is sometimes recovered as a tribe in Phorusrhacinae.

Brontornithinae was named by Argentine paleontologists Francisco Moreno and Alcides Mercerat in 1891 and encompassed Brontornis, Physornis, and Paraphysornis in several studies. However, Brontornis is likely an anseriform or gastornithid instead. Consequently, in 2007 Argentine paleontologist Federico Agnolín erected the subfamily Physornithinae for Physornis and Paraphysornis. Two years later, he defined Physornithinae as including Physornis, Paraphysornis, and all of their descendants. This group is united by several characteristics, including the presence of a robust, wide mandibular symphysis and an anteroposteriorly (front-back) flattened tarsometatarsus. These characteristics are comparable to those of the similarly graviportal (slow moving), large-bodied dromornithids and Gastornis. Physornithines bear the most solid mandibles and among the most robust tarsometatarsi in Phorusrhacidae.

Topology 1: Alvarenga et al. (2011) results

- Phorusrhacidae
  - Mesembriornithinae
  - - Psilopterinae
    - - Patagornis
      - Andrewsornis
      - Andalgalornis
      - Phorusrhacos
      - Titanis
      - - Devincenzia
        - Kelenken
      - Brontornis
      - Physornis
      - Paraphysornis

Topology 2: Degrange et al. (2015) results

- Phorusrhacidae
  - - Mesembriornithinae
    - Psilopterinae
  - - Kelenken guillermoi
    - - Devincenzia pozzi
      - - Titanis walleri
        - - - Phorusrhacos longissimus
            - Andalgalornis steulleti
            - Andrewsornis abbotti
            - Patagornis marshi
            - Physornis fortis
          - Paraphysornis brasiliensis

== Paleobiology ==
=== Feeding and diet ===
Phorusrhacids are thought to have been ground predators or scavengers, and have often been considered apex predators that dominated Cenozoic South America in the absence of placental mammalian predators, though they did co-exist with some large, carnivorous borhyaenid mammals. Earlier hypotheses of phorusrhacid feeding ecology were mainly inferred from them having large skulls with hooked beaks rather than through detailed hypotheses and biomechanical studies, and such studies of their running and predatory adaptations were only conducted from the beginning of the 21st century. In general, phorusrhacids are separated into two primary ecological stances. Smaller, lithe genera like Psilopterus and Procariama are thought to have filled a sereima-like niche, feeding on smaller prey and potentially bearing limited flight abilities. Meanwhile, Physornis and other gigantic genera are presumed to have been macropredators and apex predators. Unlike the cursorial genera Phorusrhacos, Procariama, and Psilopterus, Physornis was a graviportal ambush hunter based on its proportions.

Brazilian researchers Herculano Alvarenga and Elizabeth Höfling made some general remarks about phorusrhacid habits in a 2003 article. They were flightless, as evidenced by the proportional size of their wings and body mass, and wing-size was more reduced in larger members of the group. These researchers pointed out that the narrowing of the pelvis, upper maxilla and thorax could have been adaptations to enable the birds to search for and take smaller animals in tall plant growth or broken terrain. The large expansions above the eyes formed by the lacrimal bones (similar to what is seen in modern hawks) would have protected the eyes against the sun, and enabled keen eyesight, which indicates they hunted by sight in open, sunlit areas, and not shaded forests.

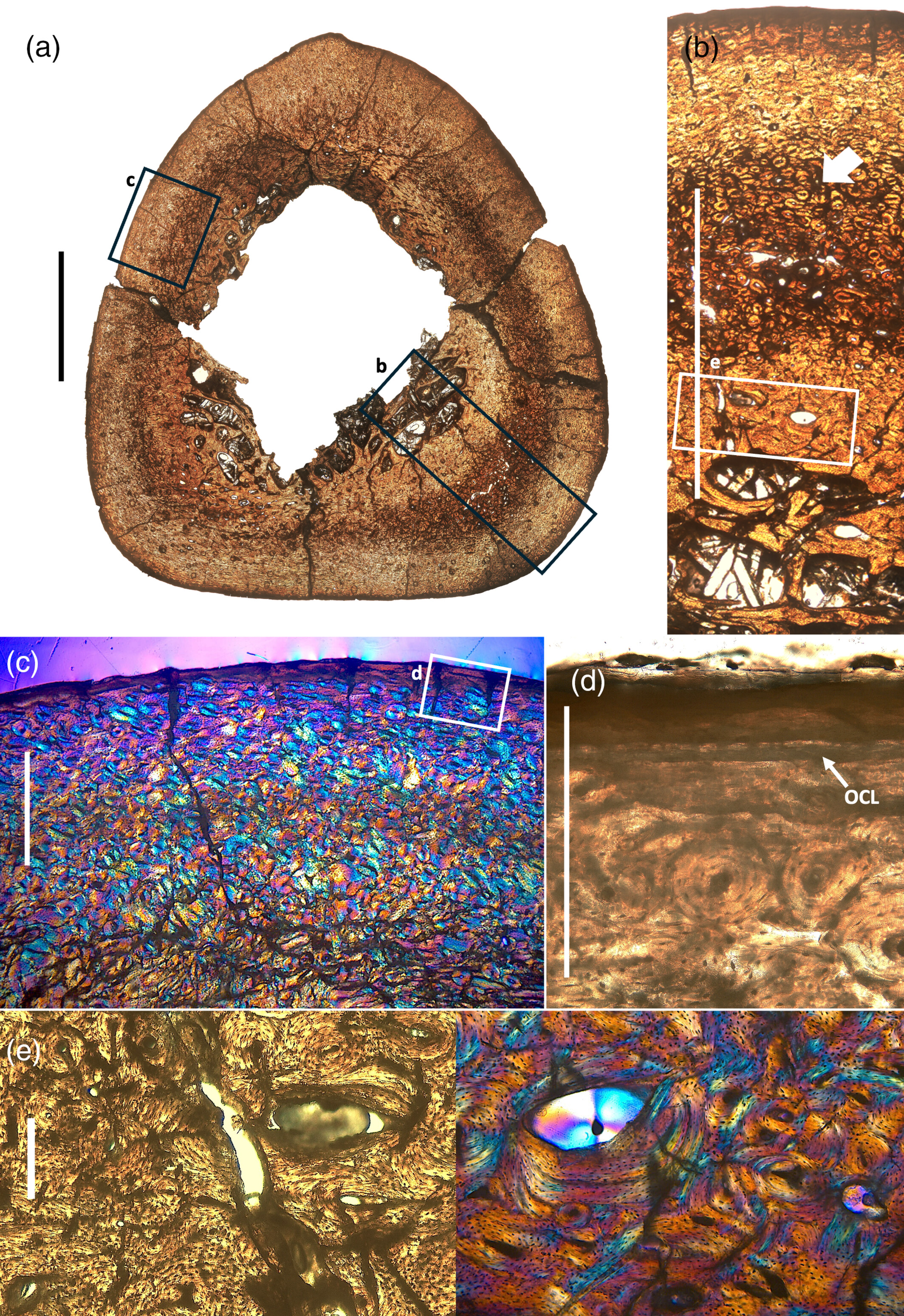
Cross section of bone tissues from a tarsometatarsus

=== Histology ===
In 2026, German paleontologist Lotta Dreyer and colleagues published a study that analyzed the histology and growth patterns of Physornis and Andrewsornis. Using the limb bones of FM-P13619, Dreyer and colleagues extracted thin bone samples which they studied using ground-section microscopy. This allowed them to research the growth structures, vascularization systems, and remodeling processes of the bone tissues. The femur fragment displays a stocky set of cortical bone, which features highly vascularized fibrolamellar interspersed with secondary osteons. Both Andrewsornis and Physornis displayed a consistent pattern of rapid growth, similar to that of modern birds, shown by the transition of its fibrolamellar bone from greatly vascularized to less vascularized and more laminar. Additionally, all fossils lacked LAGs (lines of arrested growth), indicating no pauses in the bone growth. This demonstrates that the growth was exponential without major pauses or logarithmic. Although, LAGs are observable in the OCL of all three Physornis fossils, showing that it experienced episodic late-stage deposition after somatic maturity. This characteristic is found in other birds like Ficedula and Raphus as well. Of the three bones, the tarsometatarsus bears the most secondary remodeling and a dense Haversian system.

Despite differences in size between Andrewsornis, Patagornis, and Physornis, histological studies show a common developmental strategy between the three. However, slight differences in the LAGs between Physornis and Andrewsornis may be a result of divergences in size, ontogeny, or allometric scaling effects. Prominent lines are observable on Physornis' fossils, some of which are strongly developed for muscles involved in generating power, like the m. femorotibialis. This, in addition to the structure of the tarsometatarsus and the density of the bones, indicates that Physornis had stocky hind limbs built for energized, relatively slow movement. Although, these results may be influenced by ontogenetic, size, or sampling factors. Furthermore, the authors noted that cursoriality (adaptations for running) and graviportality (adaptations for slower movement) are on a spectrum, going on to state that Physornis could have conducted short, fast bursts sprints at times. In contrast, Andrewsornis has limbs designed for more constant cursorial movement.

== Paleoecology ==
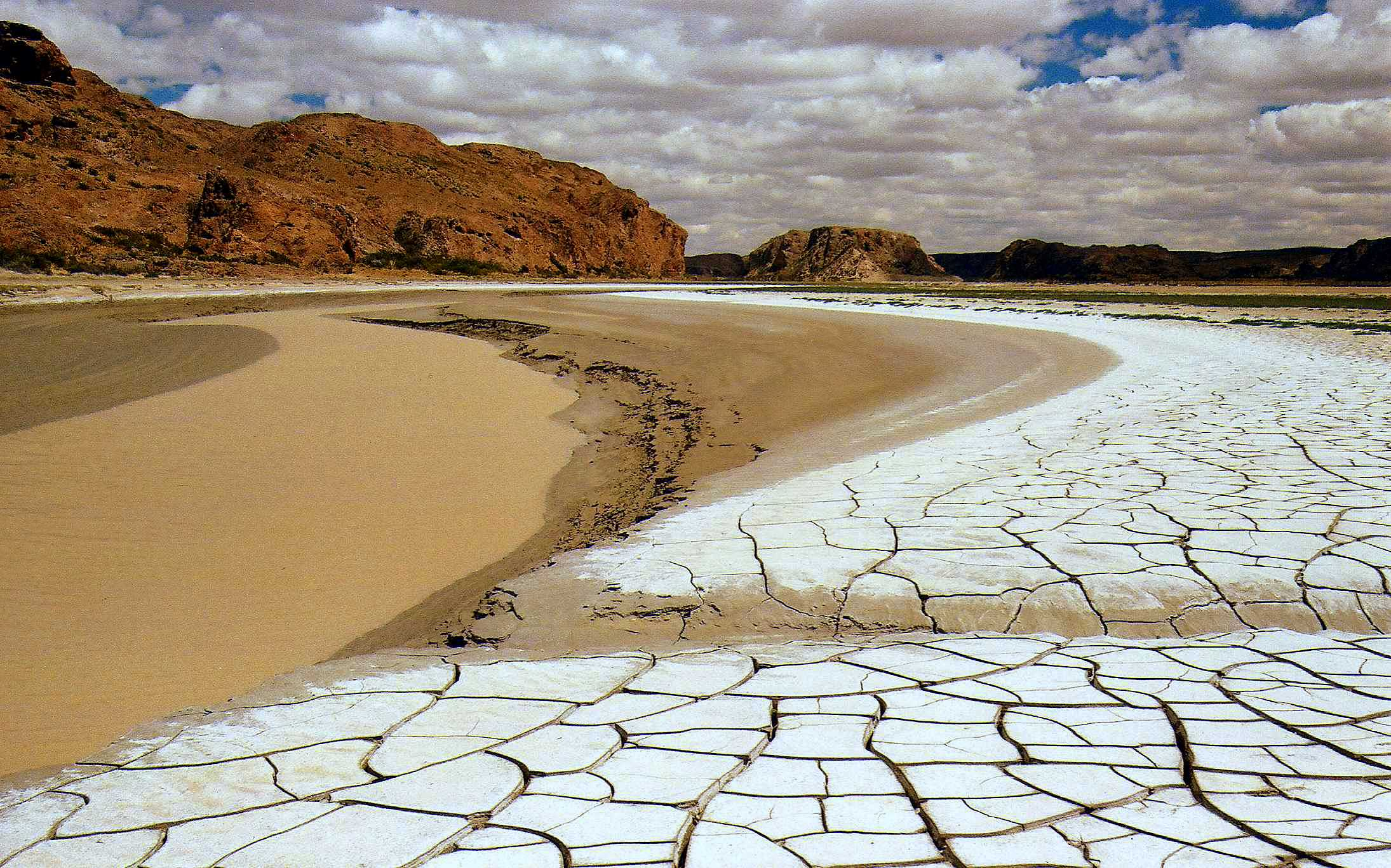
The Río Deseado, where Physornis was originally found

Physornis is known from the Deseadan of Chubut and Santa Cruz Provinces in northern Patagonia, Argentina. The Puesto Almendra Member of the Sarmiento Formation, where some Physornis fossils have been unearthed, preserves a diverse array of birds and mammals. Here, birds have been reported such as the other phorusrhacid Andrewsornis and the possible anhimid Loxornis. The small phorusrhacid Psilopterus is also known from the Deseadan sediments of the Deseado River, where the holotype was discovered. As for mammals, the Oligocene of Argentina saw the growth of several endemic mammal groups. Due to its isolation from other continents, South America fostered its own, distinct lineages of mammals and birds, such as phorusrhacids themselves. As a result, many of the taxa found in Argentine deposits for example are from clades not found elsewhere. Examples of this lived during the Deseadan, including herbivores like the notoungulates Ancylocoelus, Archaeotypotherium, Cochilius, and Eurygenium, litopterns such as Coniopternium, Cramauchenia, and Tricoelodus, and xenarthrans including Octodontotherium, Peltephilus, and Stenotatus.

During the Deseadan SALMA (which corresponds to the late Oligocene-early Miocene, 29-21 mya) of Santa Cruz Province, Physornis had a graviportal macropedatory ecological role. However, Physornis' woodland habitat transitioned to an open, savanna-like landscape towards the end of the Deseadan, leading to its extinction. As a result, the cursorial (adapted for running), pursuit-predator Phorusrhacos became Physornis' successor as a macropredator in Santa Cruz ecosystems. Physornis likely predated on large mammals, of which there are many found in the Deseadan of Argentina.
