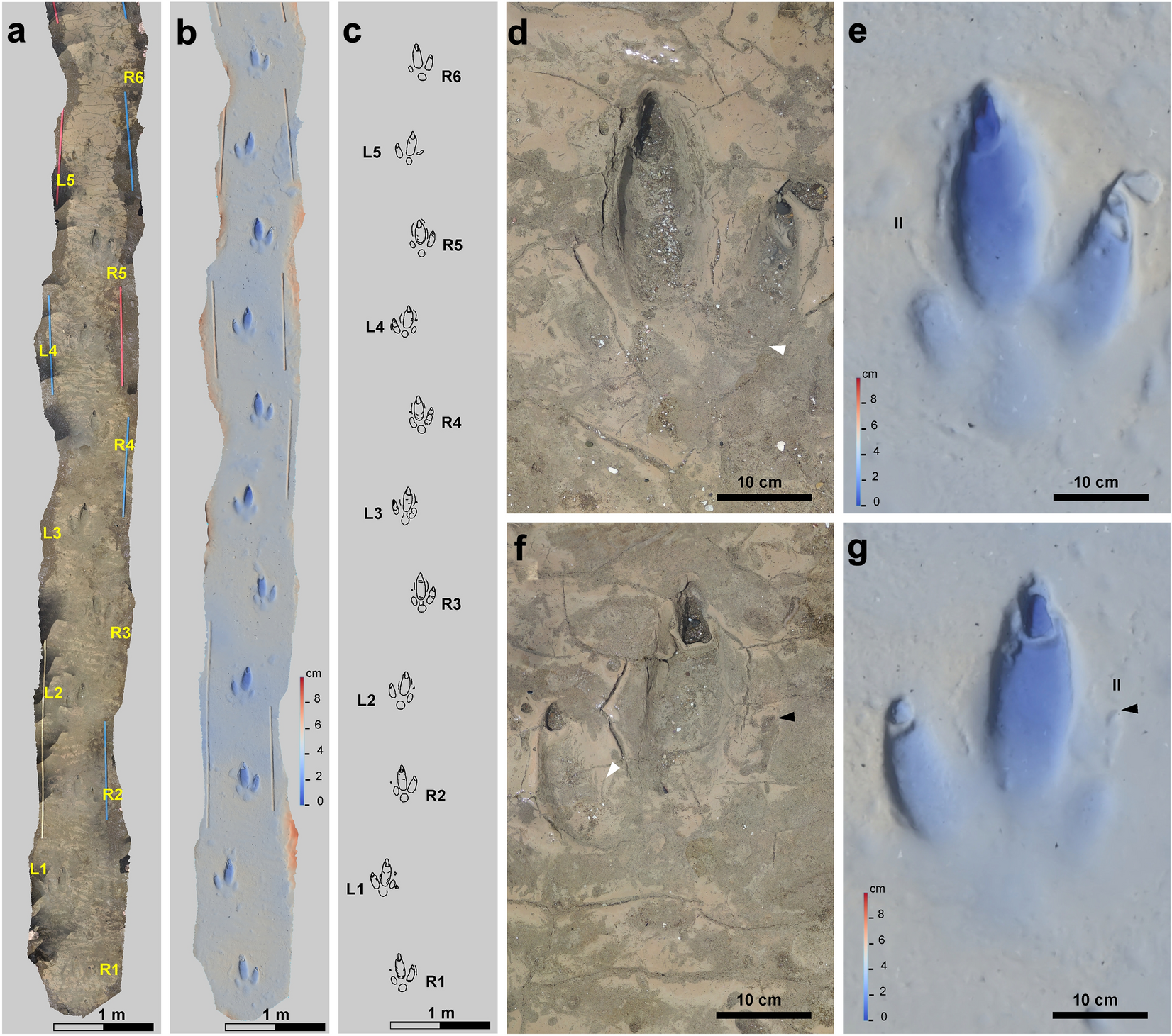
- Holotype

Trace fossil classification
- Kingdom: Animalia
- Phylum: Chordata
- Class: Aves
- Order: Cariamiformes
- Family: †Phorusrhacidae
- Genus: †Rionegrina; Melchor et. al, 2023

Type ichnospecies
- †Rionegrina pozosaladensis Melchor et. al, 2026

= Rionegrina =

Rionegrina Temporal range: Late Miocene, ~8.1–7.9 Ma

Bird footprint

Rionegrina is the name given to a trace fossil (ichnotaxon) found in Late Miocene rocks in Río Negro Province, Argentina. The only specimen consists of a trackway described by Argentine paleontologist Ricardo N. Melchor and colleagues in 2023, with the only known ichnospecies R. pozosaladensis. Melchor and colleagues interpreted the tracks as the fossil footprints of a phorusrhacid bird, the first described of their kind. They stated the creator of the trackway was above 55 kilograms (121 lb), probably between 60–80 kilograms (130–180 lb), around the size as the phorusrhacids Mesembriornis and Paraphysornis.
