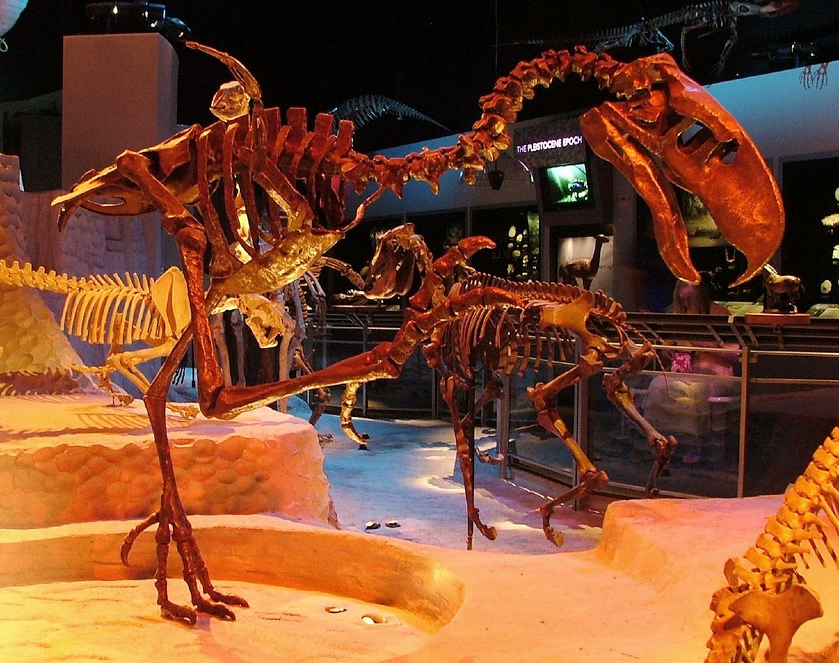
- Reconstructed skeleton of Titanis walleri, Florida Museum of Natural History

Scientific classification
- Kingdom: Animalia
- Phylum: Chordata
- Class: Aves
- Order: Cariamiformes
- Superfamily: †Phorusrhacoidea; Ameghino, 1889
- Family: †Phorusrhacidae; Ameghino, 1889

Type species
- †Phorusrhacos longissimus Ameghino, 1887

Subgroups
- †Brontornis?; †Patagorhacos; †Psilopterinae Dolgopol de Saez, 1927; †Eschatornis; †Procariama; †Psilopterus; †Mesembriornithinae Kraglievich, 1932; †Llallawavis; †Mesembriornis; †Patagornithinae Mercerat, 1897; †Andalgalornis; †Andrewsornis; †Patagornis; †Phorusrhacinae Ameghino, 1889; †Devincenzia; †Kelenken; †Phorusrhacos; †Titanis; †Physornithinae Agnolin, 2007; †Paraphysornis; †Physornis
- Areas of the Americas where phorusrhacid fossils have been discovered, organized by color.

Synonyms
- Family synonymy: Pelecyornidae Ameghino, 1891; Brontornithidae Moreno & Mercerat, 1891; Darwinornithidae Moreno & Mercerat, 1891; Stereornithidae Moreno & Mercerat, 1891; Patagornithidae Mercerat, 1897; Hermosiornidae Rovereto, 1914; Psilopteridae Dolgopol de Saez, 1927; Devincenziidae Kraglievich, 1932; Mesembriorniidae Kraglievich, 1932

= Phorusrhacidae =

Phorusrhacidae Temporal range: Middle Eocene – Late Pleistocene ~43–0.025 Ma Possible Early Eocene records

Extinct family of flightless birds

Phorusrhacidae, colloquially known as terror birds, is a family of large carnivorous, mostly flightless birds that includes possibly several subfamilies containing many genera, including the eponymous Phorusrhacos. The exact number of genera is uncertain, as some taxa such as Brontornis may be different forms of bird instead. All phorusrhacids lived during the Cenozoic era in the Americas. However, fossils have been recorded from Africa and Europe that may belong to phorusrhacids. Possible specimens have also been discovered from the La Meseta Formation of Seymour Island, Antarctica, suggesting that this group had a wider geographical range in the Paleogene. While a majority of phorusrhacids are known from South America, Titanis is known from the southern United States. Their definitive fossil records range from the Middle Eocene to the Late Pleistocene around 43 to 0.025 million years ago, though some specimens suggest that they were present since the Early Eocene.

Phorusrhacids ranged widely in size, with the smallest members like Psilopterus measuring 1 meter (3.3 ft) tall whereas giants like Devincenzia possibly reached 3 meters (9.8 ft) tall. Their closest modern-day relatives are believed to be the 80-centimetre-tall (31 in) seriemas. Phorusrhacids were bipedal carnivores with large skulls that terminated in elongated, sharp beaks. Although it varies between genera, most phorusrhacids had elongated, lithe hindlimbs with a sickle claw on their innermost toe. In contrast, their arms were relatively small and bore no functional digits.

Phorusrhacidae was coined by Argentine paleontologist Florentino Ameghino in 1889 and it initially included just two genera: Phorusrhacos and Tolmodus (a synonym of Patagornis). At the time, Ameghino believed it was a family of giant, edentulous xenarthran mammals possibly related to anteaters. In 1891, Argentine paleontologist Francisco Moreno pointed out that phorusrhacids were giant birds instead. The two scientists engaged in a heated scientific rivalry for decades, during which they named dozens of new phorusrhacid genera and species. Following this, the taxonomy of the group was poorly understood and many species named were later interpreted as nomen dubia or synonyms of previously named phorusrhacids. Although genera like Llallawavis and Patagornis are represented by complete remains, most phorusrhacids are only known from fragmentary or isolated material. This has caused debate and confusion over the interrelationships, anatomy, and size of the family.

== Description ==
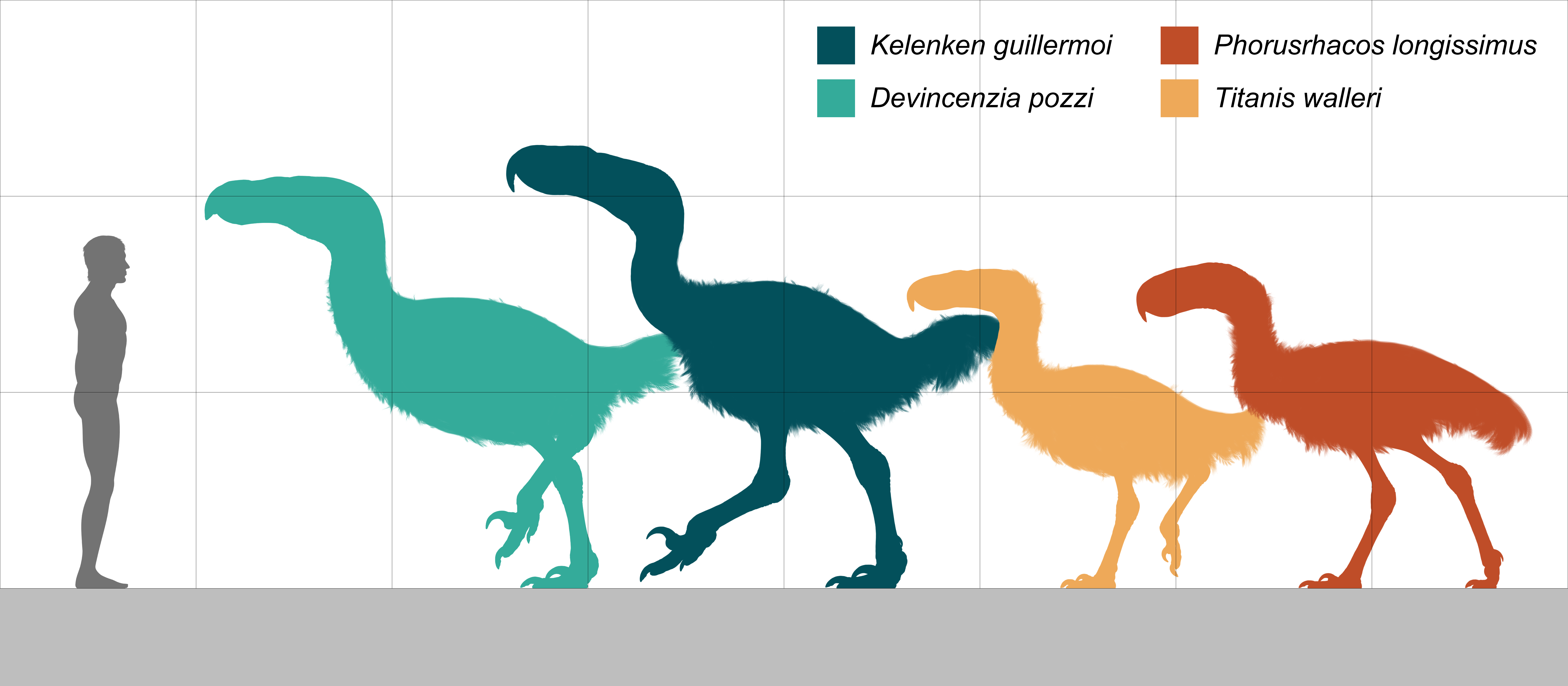
Size comparison of some phorusrhacids, including Kelenken, Devincenzia, Phorusrhacos, and Titanis

The neck can be divided into three main regions. In the higher regions of the neck, the phorusrhacid has bifurcate neural spines (BNS), while it has high neural spines in its lower regions. This suggests that the phorusrhacid had a highly flexible and developed neck allowing it to carry its heavy head and strike with terrifying speed and power. Although the phorusrhacid externally looks like it has a short neck, its flexible skeletal neck structure proves that it could expand farther beyond the expected reach and intimidate its prey using its height, allowing it to strike more easily. Once stretched out into its full length in preparation for a downward strike, its developed neck muscles and heavy head could produce enough momentum and power to cause fatal damage to the terror bird's prey.

Kelenken guillermoi, from the Langhian stage of the Miocene epoch, some 15 million years ago, discovered in the Collón Curá Formation in Patagonia in 2006, represents the largest bird skull yet found. The fossil has been described as being a 71-centimetre (28 in), nearly intact skull. The beak is roughly 46 cm (18 in) long and curves in a hook shape that resembles an eagle's beak. Most species described as phorusrhacid birds were smaller, 60–90 cm (2.0–3.0 ft) tall, but the new fossil belongs to a bird that probably stood about 3 m (9.8 ft) tall. Scientists theorize that the large terror birds were extremely nimble and quick runners, able to reach speeds of 48 km/h (30 mph). Examination of phorusrhacid habitats also indicates that phorusrhacids may have presented intense competition to predatory metatherian sparassodonts such as borhyaenids and thylacosmilids, causing the mammalian predators to choose forested habitats to avoid the more successful and aggressive avian predators on the open plains.

The feet of the phorusrhacids had four toes, the first of which, known as the hallux, was reduced and did not touch the ground, while the others, corresponding to the second, third and fourth toes, were kept on the ground. Analysis of the resistance of the toes based on biomechanical models of curved beams, in particular of the second toe and its nail claw, indicate that it was modified into a "sickle claw" and was relatively uniform in various species and said claw would be relatively curved and large, which implies the need to keep it elevated to avoid wear or breakage due to contact with the ground, which would be achieved with a well-developed extensor tubercle and soft tissue pads on the fingers. The second toe, which was shorter and had fewer phalanges, also had more resistance and would make it easier to hold the claw off the ground and retain prey, a compromise with its predatory function and movement on the run, as occurs with modern seriemas, although to a lesser degree of specialization than dromaeosaurid dinosaurs. This is further supported by footprints from the Late Miocene of the Río Negro Formation, showcasing a trackway made by a mid-to-large sized terror bird with functionally didactyl footprints, the inner toe with the sickle claw raised mostly off the ground akin to their Mesozoic counterparts.

=== Skull structure ===
In the past, these birds were thought to have high beaks, round orbits, and vaulted braincases though there was never enough empirical evidence to support this. However, new fossils have been discovered in Comallo, Argentina. These skulls reveal that the terror bird has a triangular dorsal view, a rostrum that is hooked and more than half the length of the actual skull, and a more compact caudal portion. The external nares and antorbital fenestras (areas found in the nose) were found to be more square than triangular. These all contribute to a skull that is more rectangular in view rather than triangular. The structure of the fossils also suggest that these birds may have been swifter than originally thought.

A skull of Psilopterus shows the internal structure of the beak was hollow and reinforced with thin-walled trabeculae. There is also an absence of both zona flexoria palatina and zona flexoria arcus jugalis, which are key features that relate to the evolution of cranial akinesis. The discovery of this skull allows for the establishment of primary osteological homologies, which are useful in comparative anatomy, functional morphology, and phylogenetic studies.

== Palaeobiology ==
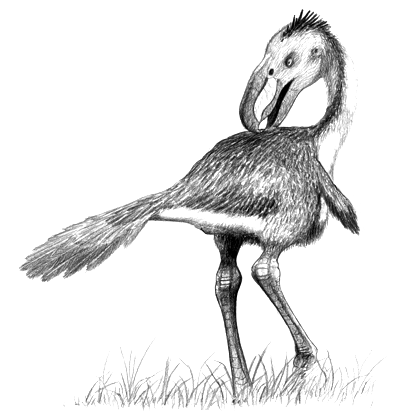
Restoration of Andalgalornis

All phorusrhacids possessed a large hooked beak and a relatively large skull. The bones of the beak were tightly fused together, making the beak more resilient to force from the front to back direction, thus suggesting that it could cause a great amount of harm through pecking, but earlier studies indicated relatively weak bite force quotients. This has led some to argue phorusrachids were poorly suited to tackle larger prey due to them being unable to effectively inflict damage without repeated blows, forcing them to rely largely on relatively tiny prey like small rodents; however, similar cranial and cervical adaptations combining relatively weak bite forces with resistance to vertical and front-to-back stresses also exist in machaidorontine felids, other sabre-toothed mammalian carnivores, and various allosauroid non-avian theropods, animals generally considered predators of larger herbivores, and later studies have found phorusrhacids to have had far greater bite forces than assumed previously. Both of these factors have led to larger phorusrhacids being once again viewed as predators of larger mammals in most recent research, while small phorusrhacids with much less robust skulls were likely small-prey specialists.

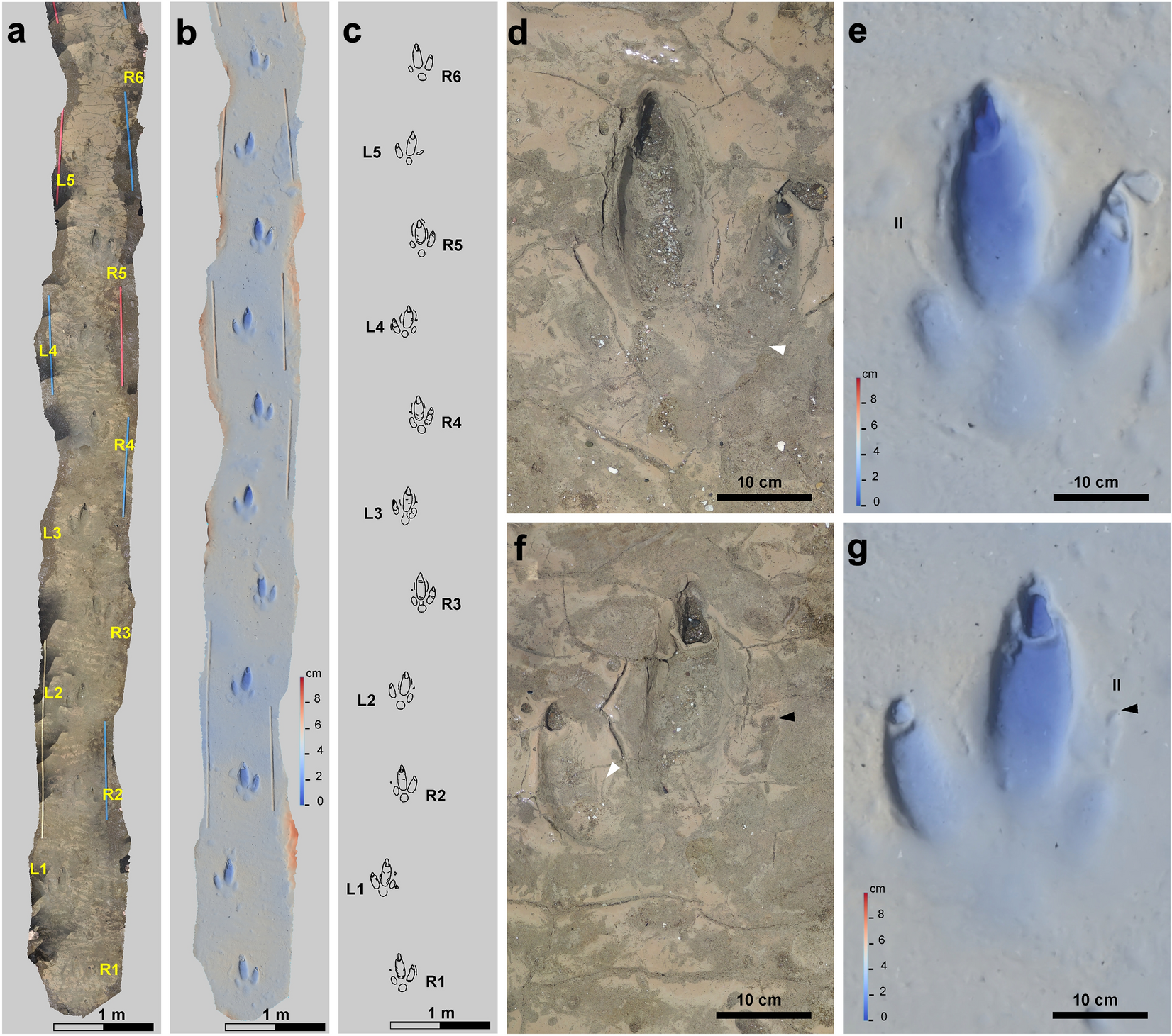
Only known phorusrhacid trackway, named Rionegrina, which confirms that they held their second toe off the ground like seriemas and dromaeosaurs

Some phorusrhacids like Andalgalornis, while very fast runners in a straight line, were poor at tight turns at speed, which contradicts the idea of phorusrhacids being agile predators of small prey and indicates a greater focus on larger prey. While others, like Llallawavis, were able to make sudden turns and changes in movement.

=== Diet ===
All phorusrhacids are thought to have been carnivorous. The strong downwards curve from the tip of this beak suggests that it ripped the flesh from the body of other animals; many extant bird species with this feature are carnivorous. CT scans performed on the skull of a phorusrhacid reveal that the species would not have been able to shake its prey side to side, but rather exert significant downward force.

Florentino Ameghino claimed in a letter to Édouard Trouessart that he had specimens from Argentina of "petrified masses preserving skeletons of large rodents, Interatheriidae [small notoungulates] and even Proterotheriidae [deer-sized litopterns], with all their bones crushed and corroded, piled on with no apparent order and forming a nearly spherical mass with the skull in the center" that resembled giant owl pellets, suggesting that phorusrhacids may have swallowed their prey whole and regurgitated the indigestible parts similar to owls. However, Ameghino never formally described these specimens and they have not yet been relocated, making it difficult to determine if they are phorusrhacid pellets. Fossilized pellets from northwestern Argentina have also been suggested to pertain to small phorusrhacids like Procariama.

=== Hearing Capabilities and Vocalisations ===
A study done on the skull of Llallawavis suggests phorusrhacids were adapted to hear low-frequency sounds. CT scans of the inner ear indicate that Llallawavis could detect frequencies between 380 Hz and 4,230 Hz, with optimal hearing in the 2,300 Hz range. This also indicates they may have produced deep vocalisations similar to those of other large terrestrial birds, such as bustards and cassowaries.

== Classification ==
During the early Cenozoic, after the extinction of the non-bird dinosaurs, mammals underwent an evolutionary diversification, and some bird groups around the world developed a tendency towards gigantism; this included the Gastornithidae, the Dromornithidae, the Palaeognathae and the Phorusrhacidae. Phorusrhacids are an extinct group within Cariamiformes, the only living members of which are the two species of seriemas in the family Cariamidae. While they are the most speciose group within Cariamiformes, the interrelationships between phorusrhacids are unclear due to the incompleteness of their remains.

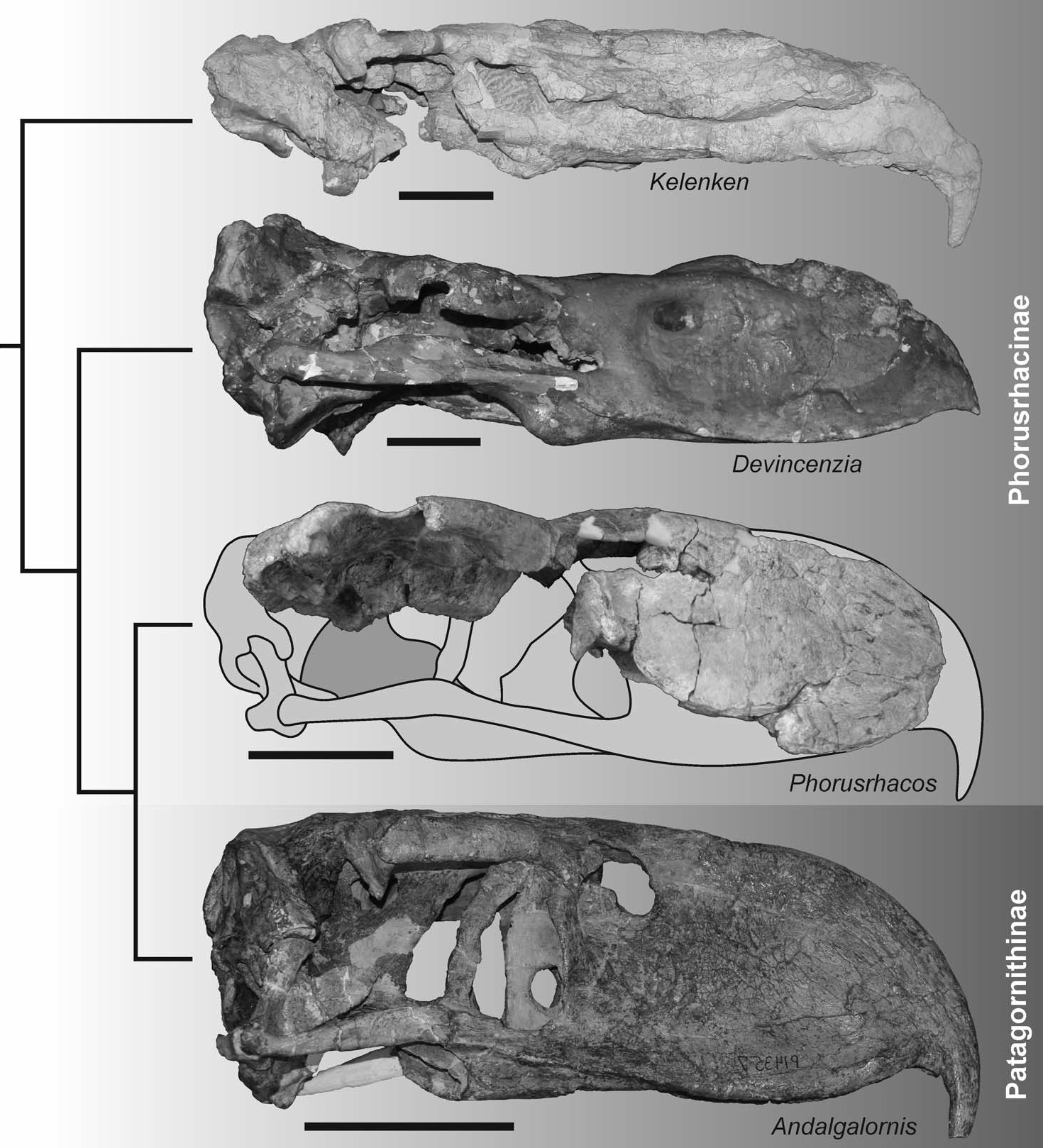
Skulls of Phorusrhacinae and Andalgalornis (a possible phorusrhacine)

Phorusrhacos is the type genus of the superfamily Phorusrhacoidea, family Phorusrhacidae and subfamily Phorusrhacinae. Phorusrhacidae is an extinct group of flightless, carnivorous birds that occupied one of the dominant, large land-predator niches in South America from the lower Eocene to the Pleistocene. They dispersed into North America during the Great American Biotic Interchange (~3 Ma). Some remains from Africa and Europe and the Paleocene of Brazil have been assigned to this clade or identified as phylogenetically related to the extant South American seriemas, but these assignments remain controversial. Phorusrhacos was the first phorusrhacid to be discovered or named. Prior to being recognized as a bird, it was placed in the group Edentata, an antique name for a clade believed to include mammals like sloths, pangolins, and armadillos. Phorusrhacidae was a clade created by Ameghino (1889), he mistakenly dubbed it Phororhacosidae and believed it was related to the anteater Myrmecophaga. Moreno (1888) was the first to recognize the avian affinities of the phorusrhacids, referring to them as "large birds", while Moreno and was described in 1891 by Moreno and Mercerat (1891) erected the group Stereornithes to encompass them. They also stated that Stereornithes was a transitional stage between the Anatidae and the Vulturidae. Furthermore, in their paper, Phorusrhacos was described as a bird for the first time in literature. This clade is now considered synonymous with Phorusrhacidae, and it was not until Lydekker (1893) that Phorusrhacidae was moved to Neognathae. In Andrews (1899) description of Patagornis fossils (then believed to come from Phorusrhacos), he assigned Stereornithes (=Phorusrhacidae) to Cariamae, the clade including the closest living relatives of the phorusrhacids, cariamas.

The interrelationships of Phorusrhacidae are unclear, partly due to their sparse fossil record. Dolgolpol de Saez (1927), still using the term Stereornithes for Phorusrhacidae, stated that it was divided into two families: Phororhacidae (=Phorusrhacidae), which included genera like Phorusrhacos and Psilopterus, and Brontornithes, which included genera like Brontornis and Liornis. Patterson and Kraglievich (1960) went on to break up Phororhacoidea (=Phorusrhacoidea) into two families: Psilopteridae, which featured the subfamilies Psilopterinae and Hermosiornithinae, and Phororhacidae (=Phorusrhacidae), which featured Phororhacinae (=Phorusrhacinae) and Tolmodinae (=Patagornithinae). It was not until Brodkorb (1967) that Phororhacidae was corrected to Phorusrhacidae in literature. Furthermore, Brodkorb (1967) constricted Phorusrhacidae to the subfamilies Brontornithinae, Paleociconiinae, and Phorusrhacinae. In 2003, Brazilian paleontologists Herculano Alvarenga and Elizabeth Höfling published a revision of the family in which they recognized six subfamilies, Brontornithinae, Mesembriornithinae, Patagornithinae, Phorusrhacinae, Physornithinae, and Psilopterinae, and defined each one. In a separate study, Alvarenga and colleagues (2011) performed a phylogenetic analysis (a study of the evolutionary relationships between organisms), which recovered Patagornithinae, Phorusrhacinae, and Physornithinae in a polytomy (an unnatural grouping) (topology 1). A later phylogenetic analysis by Degrange and colleagues (2015) found Phorusrhacidae to include Mesembrironithinae and Psilopterinae as distinct, while Patagornithinae, Phorusrhacinae, and Physornithinae is in polytomy (topology 2).

Topology 1: Alvarenga et al. (2011) results

- Phorusrhacidae
  - Mesembriornithinae
  - - Psilopterinae
    - - Patagornis
      - Andrewsornis
      - Andalgalornis
      - Phorusrhacos
      - Titanis
      - - Devincenzia
        - Kelenken
      - Brontornis
      - Physornis
      - Paraphysornis

Topology 2: Degrange et al. (2015) results

- Phorusrhacidae
  - - Mesembriornithinae
    - Psilopterinae
  - - Kelenken guillermoi
    - - Devincenzia pozzi
      - - Titanis walleri
        - - - Phorusrhacos longissimus
            - Andalgalornis steulleti
            - Andrewsornis abbotti
            - Patagornis marshi
            - Physornis fortis
          - Paraphysornis brasiliensis

Following the revision by Alvarenga and Höfling (2003), there are now 5 subfamilies, containing 13 genera and 22 species: These species were the product of adaptive radiation. The following classification is based on LaBarge, Garderner & Organ (2024), and taxa identified as incertae sedis were all excluded from phylogenetic analysis in their study (except for Brontornis):

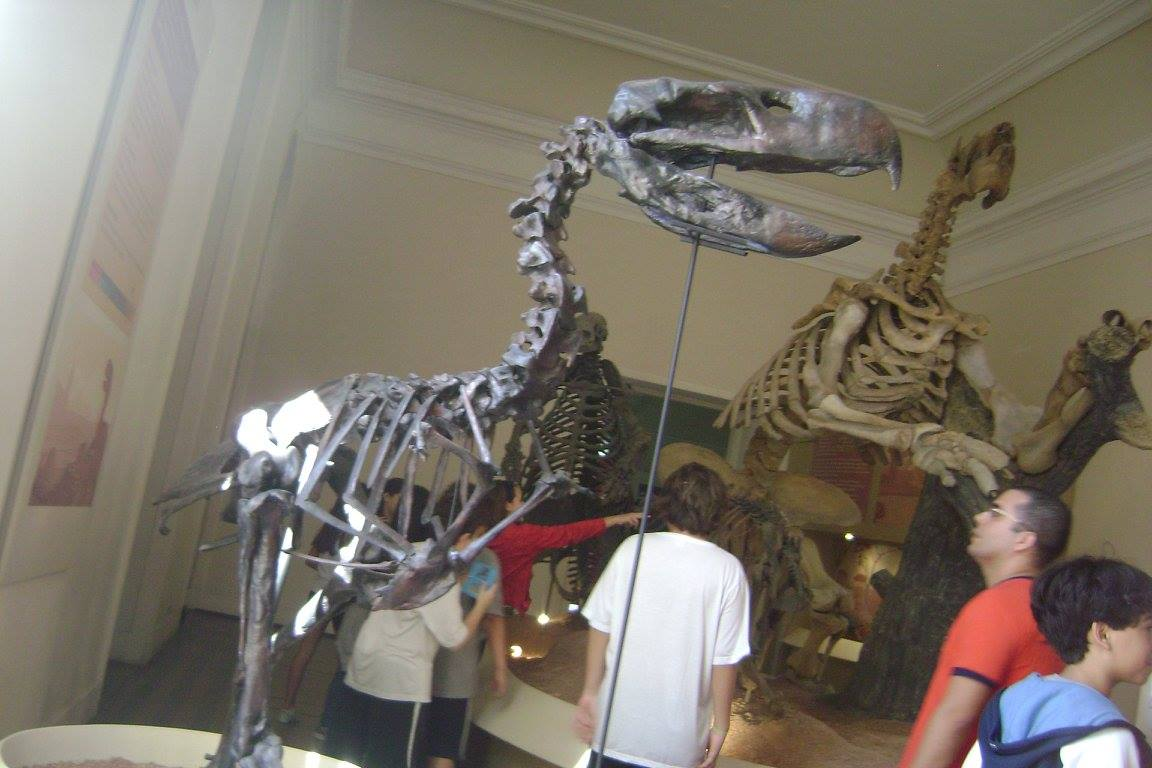
Reconstructed skeleton of Paraphysornis at the Museu Nacional, Rio de Janeiro

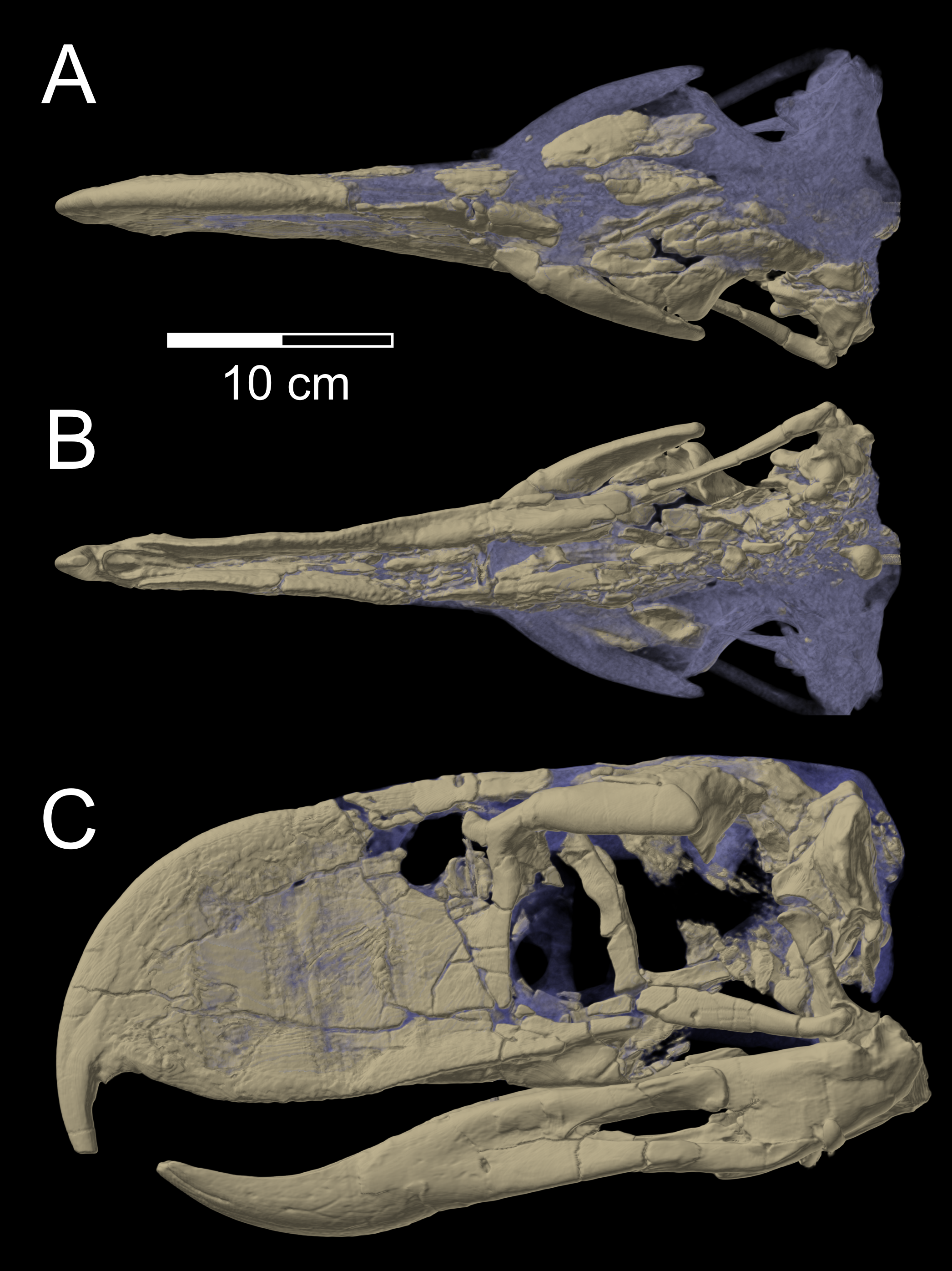
CT scan of the skull of P 14357, holotype of Andalgalornis ferox in the collections of the Field Museum of Natural History

Family Phorusrhacidae

- Incertae sedis
  - Genus ?Lavocatavis – Middle Eocene Glib Zegdou Formation of Algeria (likely more related to a possible paleognath Eremopezus)
  - Genus Patagorhacos – Early Miocene Chichinales Formation of Rio Negro Province, Argentina.
  - Genus ?Paleopsilopterus – Lower Eocene (Itaboraian) Itaboraí Formation of Itaboraí, Brazil (identity as a phorusrhacid dubious)
  - Genus ?Brontornis – Early to Middle Miocene (Santacrucian–Laventan) Santa Cruz and Monte León Formations, Argentina – gigantic species, standing on average 8.6 feet (2.6 m) high. Placement in Phorusrhacidae and/or monophyly disputed.
  - Genus ?Eleutherornis – Middle Eocene (Bartonian) of Rhône, France and Baselland, Switzerland (a cariamiform, probably more related to Strigogyps)
- Subfamily Physornithinae — equivalent to Brontornithinae, if Brontornis is included within the family
  - Genus Paraphysornis (Late Oligocene to Early Miocene (Deseadan) Tremembé Formation of São Paulo State, Brazil)
  - Genus Physornis (Middle to Late Oligocene (Deseadan) Sarmiento Formation of Santa Cruz Province, Argentina)
- Subfamily Phorusrhacinae — giant species 8.3 feet (2.5 m) high (Kelenken up to 9.8 feet (3.0 m) high), but somewhat slender and decidedly more nimble than the Brontornithinae
  - Genus Devincenzia – Miocene to Early Pliocene, possibly up to Early Pleistocene
  - Genus Kelenken – Middle Miocene (Colloncuran) Collón Curá Formation of Río Negro Province, Argentina; largest known phorusrhacid
  - Genus Phorusrhacos – Early to Middle Miocene (Santacrucian) Santa Cruz Formation of Argentina
  - Genus Titanis – Early Pliocene to Early Pleistocene (Blancan) of Florida, California, and Texas
- Subfamily Patagornithinae — intermediate sized and very nimble species, standing around 5.4 feet (1.6 m) high
  - Genus Patagornis – Early to Middle Miocene (Santacrucian–Laventan) Santa Cruz Formation of Santa Cruz Province, Argentina – includes Morenomerceraria, Palaeociconia, Tolmodus
  - Genus Andrewsornis – Middle to Late Oligocene (Deseadan) Agua de la Piedra Formation of southern Argentina
  - Genus Andalgalornis – Late Miocene to Early Pliocene (Huayquerian) Ituzaingó Formation of northwestern Argentina
- Subfamily Psilopterinae — small species, standing 3.2 feet (0.98 m) high
  - Genus Eschatornis - Late Pleistocene of Brazil
  - Genus Psilopterus – Middle Oligocene (Deseadan) Santa Cruz Formation and Late Miocene (Chasicoan) Arroyo Chasicó Formation of southern and eastern Argentina respectively (Possible Late Pleistocene (Lujanian) records from Uruguay)
  - Genus Procariama – Late Miocene to Early Pliocene (Huayquerian–Montehermosan) Cerro Azul and Andalhualá Formations of Catamarca Province, Argentina
- Subfamily Mesembriornithinae — medium-sized species, standing 4.4 feet (1.3 m) high
  - Genus Mesembriornis – Late Miocene to Late Pliocene (Montehermosan) Monte Hermoso Formation of Argentina
  - Genus Llallawavis – Late Pliocene (Chapadmalalan) Playa Los Lobos Allo Formation of northeastern Argentina

Alvarenga and Höfling did not include the Ameghinornithidae from Europe in the phorusrhacoids; these have meanwhile turned out to be more basal members of Cariamae. Though traditionally considered as members of the Gruiformes, based on both morphological and genetic studies (the latter being based on the seriema) Cariamiformes may belong to a separate group of birds, Australaves, and their closest living relatives, according to nuclear sequence studies, are a clade consisting of Falconidae, Psittaciformes and Passeriformes.

== Extinction ==
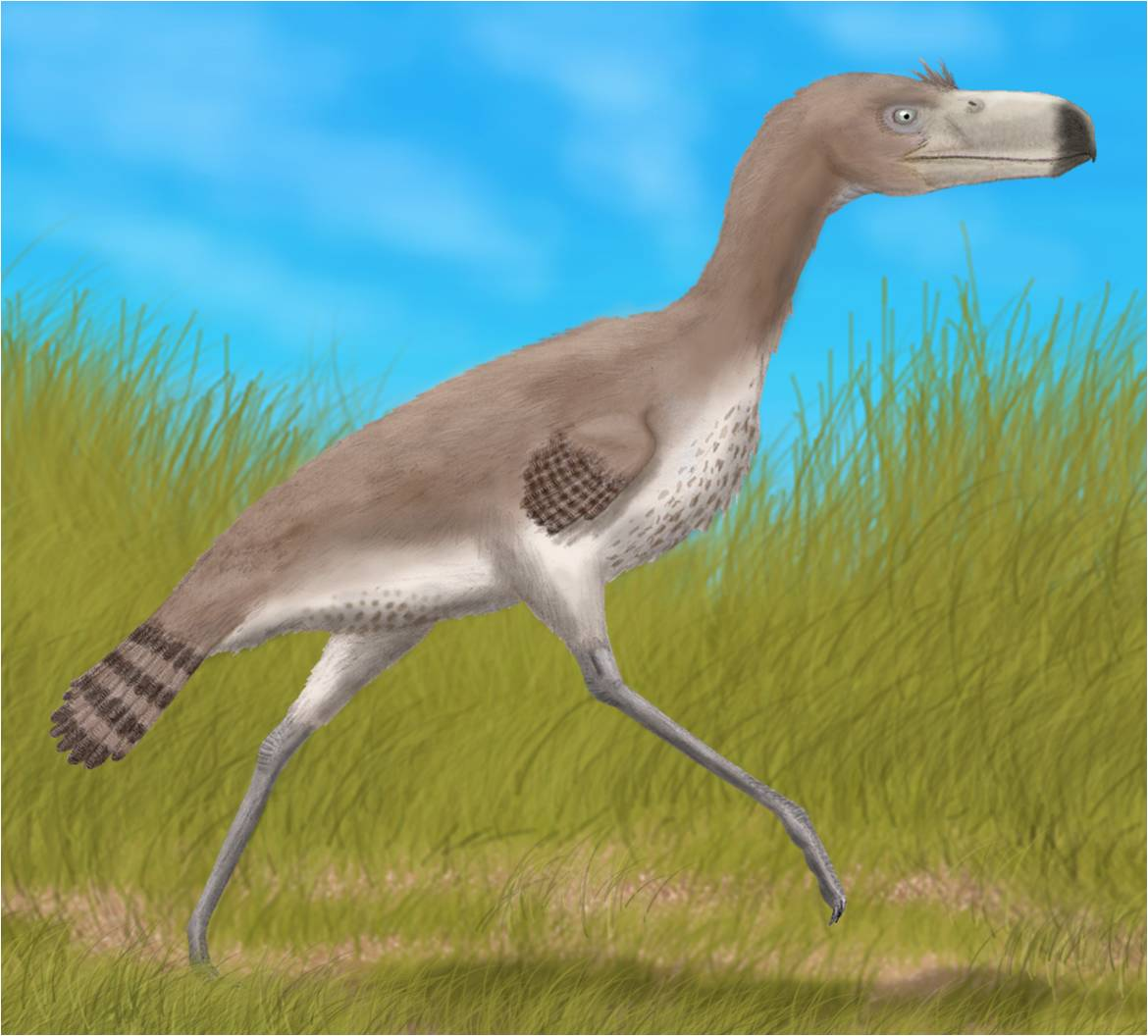
Life restoration of Procariama in paleoenvironment

During the Miocene and early Pliocene epochs, there was an increase in the phorusrhacid population size in South America, suggesting that, in that time frame, the various species flourished as predators in the savanna environment.

With the emergence of the Isthmus of Panama 2.7 million years ago, carnivorous dogs, bears, and cats from North America were able to cross into South America, increasing competition. (They had been preceded by procyonids as early as 7.3 million years ago.) Traditionally, workers assumed that population of phorusrhacids declined thereafter and suggested that competition with newly arrived predators was a major contributor to their extinction. Similar ideas have been considered for sparassodonts and for South America's terrestrial sebecid crocodilians.

However, the role of competitive displacement in the extinction of South American predator lineages has been questioned in more recent years, and has largely been discounted. The timing of turnover events and the decline of South American predators do not correlate well with the arrival of large carnivores like canids or sabretooths (although they do correlate well with the earlier-arriving procyonids, which evolved to large body size in South America, but these were omnivorous), with native South American predator lineages (including most phorusrhacids and all sparassodonts and sebecids) dying out well before the arrival of most larger placental carnivores. Bathornithids, which were similar in ecology and are likely close relatives of phorusrhacids, existed entirely within North America during part of the Cenozoic and competed successfully for a time with large carnivorans such as nimravids, before becoming extinct in the Early Miocene, about 20 million years ago. The phorusrhacid Titanis expanded northward into southern North America during the Interchange and were able to establish themselves in North America for several million years. During its existence, it coexisted with carnivorans such as borophagines, hyaenids, and machairodonts.

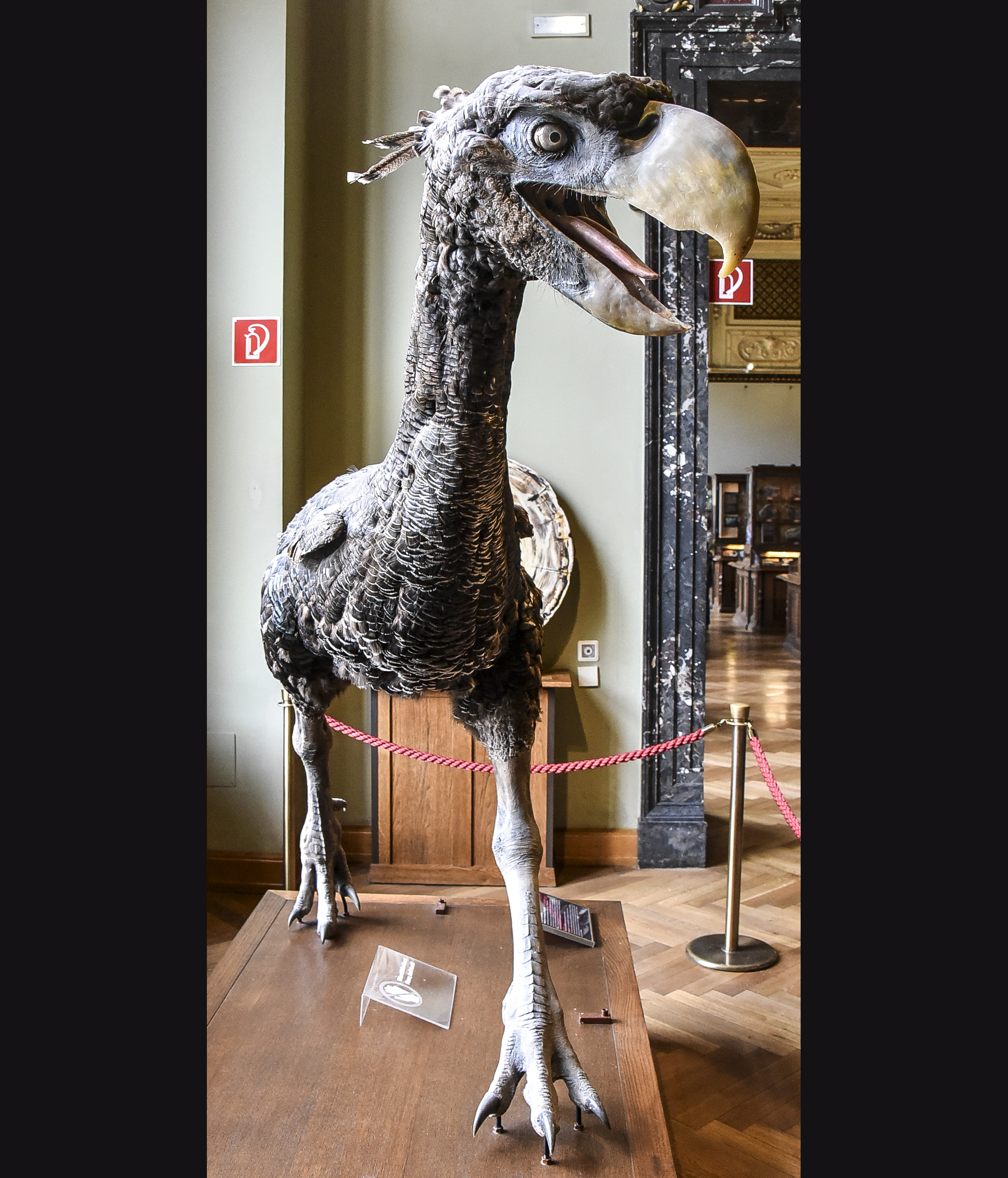
Paraphysornis brasiliensis model at the Natural History Museum Vienna

Furthermore, this hypothesis heavily relies on the idea that phorusrhacids had physiological and paleontological similarities to insular birds. Despite being an isolated continent, South America was considerably different than islands inhabited by flightless birds. Additionally, island evolution is influenced by the size of the land mass. Paleohistological analysis further refutes competitive replacement, as they found rapid, uninterrupted growth patterns in phoruscrhacids. This contrasts growth patterns of insular birds as they had a more protracted growth rate. This was the result of inhabiting islands or well adapted, stable ecosystems that lacked of strong predation pressure, this made insular birds more vulnerable to competition or predation. Unlike the islands flightless birds inhabited, South America had non-avian terrestrial predators such as sebecids and sparassodonts. The authors concluded that rapid, interrupted growth would've made phorusrhacids less vulnerable to competition or predation by carnivorans. This would suggest that the extinction of phorusrhacids was due to environmental conditions.

There were some suggestions that phorusrhacids, like the majority of Pleistocene megafauna, were killed off by human activity such as hunting or habitat change. This idea is no longer considered valid, as improved dating on Titanis specimens show that the last large phorusrhacids went extinct well over one and a half million years before humans arrived. However, several fossil finds of smaller forms have been described from the late Pleistocene of South America. The most definitive evidence is represented by Eschatornis, known from a partial left tibiotarsus directly dated to 25,326-25,733 cal. years Before Present. Psilopterus may have been present until 96,040 ± 6,300 years ago (maximum age obtained from the bottom of the fossil-containing stratum), which would extend the existence of the smaller members of this group of avian predators considerably. Another unidentified smaller type which may be a possible psilopterine from the La Paz Local Fauna of Uruguay has also been dated to the late Pleistocene, perhaps 17,620 ± 100 years ago based on radiocarbon analysis using accelerator mass spectrometry (AMS) for the molar enamel samples of a proboscidean from the same site, but the validity of this previous radiocarbon dating has been considered highly questionable due to the enamel's lack of collagen; the tibia of Macrauchenia patachonica from the same site has been more precisely dated to a mean value of approximately 21,600 ± 1,000 years ago based on gamma spectrometry and radiocarbon dating.
