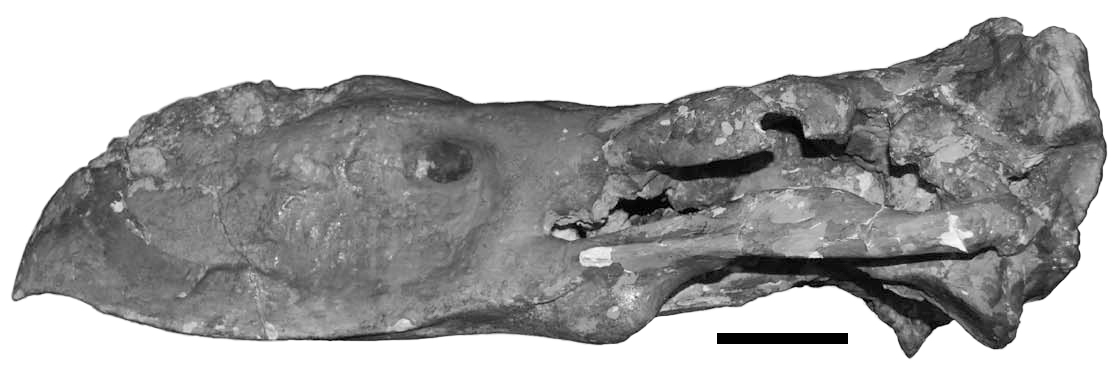
- A partial skull (MLP 37-III-7-8) possibly belonging to Devincenzia pozzi

Scientific classification
- Kingdom: Animalia
- Phylum: Chordata
- Class: Aves
- Order: Cariamiformes
- Family: †Phorusrhacidae
- Subfamily: †Phorusrhacinae
- Genus: †Devincenzia; Kraglievich, 1932

Type species
- Devincenzia gallinali Kraglievich, 1932

Other species
- D. pozzi? Kraglievich, 1931

Synonyms
- Genus synonymy: Onactornis? Cabrera, 1939; Synonyms of D.? pozzi: Phororhacos pozzi Kraglievich, 1931; Phororhacos longissimus mendocinus? Kraglievich, 1931; Devincenzia gallinali? Kraglievich, 1931; Onactornis depressus? Cabrera, 1939; Onactornis pozzi (Cabrera, 1939) Brodkorb, 1967

= Devincenzia =

Devincenzia Temporal range: Oligocene–Miocene Possible early Pleistocene record

Extinct genus of birds

Devincenzia (in honor of Garibaldi Devincenzi) is an extinct genus of phorusrhacid, a group of predominantly large, predatory flightless birds commonly known as terror birds. The first fossil attributed to the genus, an incomplete tarsometatarsus (lower leg bone) and toe bone, were described in 1931 by Uruguayan naturalist Lucas Kraglievich as coming from a new species of Phorusrhacos, P. pozzi. This specimen was discovered in sediments of the Ituzaingó Formation in Paraná, Río Negro Province in southern Argentina. Strata of this formation comes from the Huayquerian SALMA (South American Land Mammal Ages; a series of fauna-based time periods), which dates to the Late Miocene between 9 and 6.8 million years ago. The next year, Kraglievich named a new genus and species of giant bird, Devincenzia gallinali, on the basis of a nearly complete tarsometatarsus that was found in an unknown locality in southern Uruguay. It likely comes from the Arroyo Roman, which bears localities dating to the Miocene and Oligocene. In 1939, Argentine naturalist Angel Cabrera described Onactornis depressus, a species which some authors have argued is a synonym of D. pozzi.

Like Kelenken, Devincenzia was more robust and graviportal (adapted for ambush hunting) than the other phorusrhacines Phorusrhacos and Titanis. Devincenzia was carnivorous, though may have been a scavenger. The largest possible specimen may have measured 2 metres (6.6 ft) tall and weighed 200–500 kilograms (440–1,100 lb). Similar to most of its relatives, it had a tall, elongated skull with a sharply hooked beak. The skull was laterally compressed, particularly when viewed from the front. It would measure 64.5 centimetres (25.4 in) long when complete, and proportionately was an intermediate between Kelenken's elongated, robust and Phorusrhacos' short, thin skulls. On the sides of the beak are significant accessory fossae (depressions in bone) which run for most of the rostrum's length. One tibiotarsus from the Pleistocene of Uruguay, possibly coming from Devincenzia, measures 72 centimetres (2.36 ft) long and 10.4 centimetres (0.34 ft) wide at its bottom end. Its tarsometatarsus is robust, but not as stocky as that of Brontornis.

During the Miocene, the region of present-day northern Argentina was characterized by widespread waterways, a neotropical climate, and diverse flora. At the time, South America remained geographically isolated from other continents, supporting a distinctive assemblage of mammalian, avian, and reptilian fauna before the Great American Interchange. Devincenzia was an apex predator in its ecosystems, likely predating on a variety of native mammals, such as ground sloths, notoungulates, and litopterns.

== Discovery and taxonomy ==
The holotype tarsometatarsus of D. gallinali

The taxonomic history of Devincenzia is muddled due to competing ideas on its systematics. Fossils of Devincenzia were first described in 1931 by Uruguayan paleontologist Lucas Kraglievich and included a large, incomplete tarsometatarsus and an associated pedal phalanx (toe bone), which were cataloged at the Bernardino Rivadavia Natural Sciences Argentine Museum (MACN) as MACN PV 6554 and MACN PV 6681 respectfully. Kraglievich assigned them to a new species of the giant extinct bird Phorusrhacos (then misspelled Phororhacos), P. pozzi. The specific name is in honor of the lead taxidermist at the MACN, Antonio Pozzi. These remains were collected from layers of the Ituzaingó Formation in Paraná in Entre Ríos Province, Argentina, which derives from the "Mesopotamian" (now called the Huayquerian) SALMA (South American Land Mammal Ages; a series of mammalian fauna-based geologic ages) of the Late Miocene.

In 1932, Kraglievich described an isolated tarsometatarsus, deposited at the National Museum of Natural History, France under MNHN-189, that had been unearthed in an unknown locality in Uruguay. However, based on the fossil's color and texture, it likely originates from the Arroyo Roman in southern Uruguay, which has deposits that date to the Miocene or Oligocene. This was the first discovery of a phorusrhacid in Uruguay. Kraglievich assigned the tarsometatarsus to a new genus and species of bird, Devincenzia gallinali. The generic name Devincenzia comes from Uruguayan museum director and zoologist Garibaldi Devincenzi and the specific name of D. gallinali is in honor of Alejandro Gallinal, another Uruguayan scientist. Kraglievich assigned Devincenzia in its own family, the Devincenziidae, which was placed within Stereornithes (an outdated name for Phorusrhacidae).

In 1967, American ornithologist Pierce Brodkorb considered Devincenzia a synonym of Brontornis, a bird of unknown affinities, but this was opposed by later papers. Brodkorb went on to assigned Phorusrhacos longissimus mendocinus, a species Kraglievich described in 1931 on the basis of an incomplete femur, and P. pozzi to Onactornis. However, later studies have stated it is a synonym of D. pozzi or a nomen dubium. Although they are sometimes considered distinct species, in a 2003 paper, Brazilian paleontologists Herculano Alvarenga and Elizabeth Höfling considered D. gallinali a synonym of Phororhacos pozzi, which would create the combination Devincenzia pozzi. In the same study, the authors assigned an incomplete mandiblular symphysis (the area where the mandibles meet), femur (thighbone) fragment, and the distal (bottom) end of a tibiotarsus to D. pozzi, all of which were found in outcrops of the Ituzaingó Formation in Paraná.

=== Possible specimens ===
Cervical (A-B) and dorsal (C-D) vertebrae possibly coming from D. pozzi

In late August and early September 1933, fossil preparator Antonio Castro unearthed an incomplete skull and two pedal phalanges of a large phorusrhacid outside of a lagoon in Lake Epecuén in the southern Pampas of Buenos Aires Province, Argentina. Castro had initially set out to unearth a glyptodont carapace from Pleistocene layers in Adolfo Alsina Partido, but later explored "Pliocene" (now thought to be Miocene) strata deriving from the Epecuén Formation (now called the Cerro Azul Formation) north of the town. The Cerro Azul Formation dates to the Huayquerian SALMA of the Late Miocene, between 9 and 6.8 million years old. In 1939, Argentine paleontologist Angelo Cabrera scientifically described the skull and pedal phalanges, which were deposited at the Museo de La Plata under MLP 37-III-7-8, as belonging to a new genus and species of bird, Onactornis depressus. The generic name Onactornis comes from the Greek words ἄναξ ("ónax") meaning "apex" and ὄρνις ("ornis") meaning "bird", while the specific name depressus refers to the compression of the skull. In a 1967 review of bird taxonomy, Brodkorb stated that Devincenzia gallinali was a synonym of Brontornis burmeisteri, a bird of uncertain affinities, while Onactornis included the species O. depressus, O. pozzi, and O. mendocinus. In their 2003 work on Phorusrhacidae, Alvarenga and Höfling considered Devincenzia gallinali, Onactornis depressus, and O. mendocinus synonyms of Devincenzia pozzi. This has seen support from some other authors, but is still a subject of debate.

In later papers, Agnolín argued that Onactornis is actually distinct from Devincenzia for several reasons, such as that they were found 1,500 kilometres (930 mi) apart, lack any overlap in known remains, and come from different ages. He went on to state that Onactornis includes O. depressus and probably O pozzi, however a detailed study of Devincenzia taxonomy has not been published. In 2008, Argentine paleontologists Jorge Noriega and Agnolín tentatively assigned two, giant phorusrhacid vertebrae, one a cervical (neck) vertebra and the other a dorsal (back) vertebra, to D. pozzi. These remains were recovered from a Ituzaingó Formation deposit along the Paraná River in La Paz, Entre Ríos Province in northern Argentina.

== Description ==
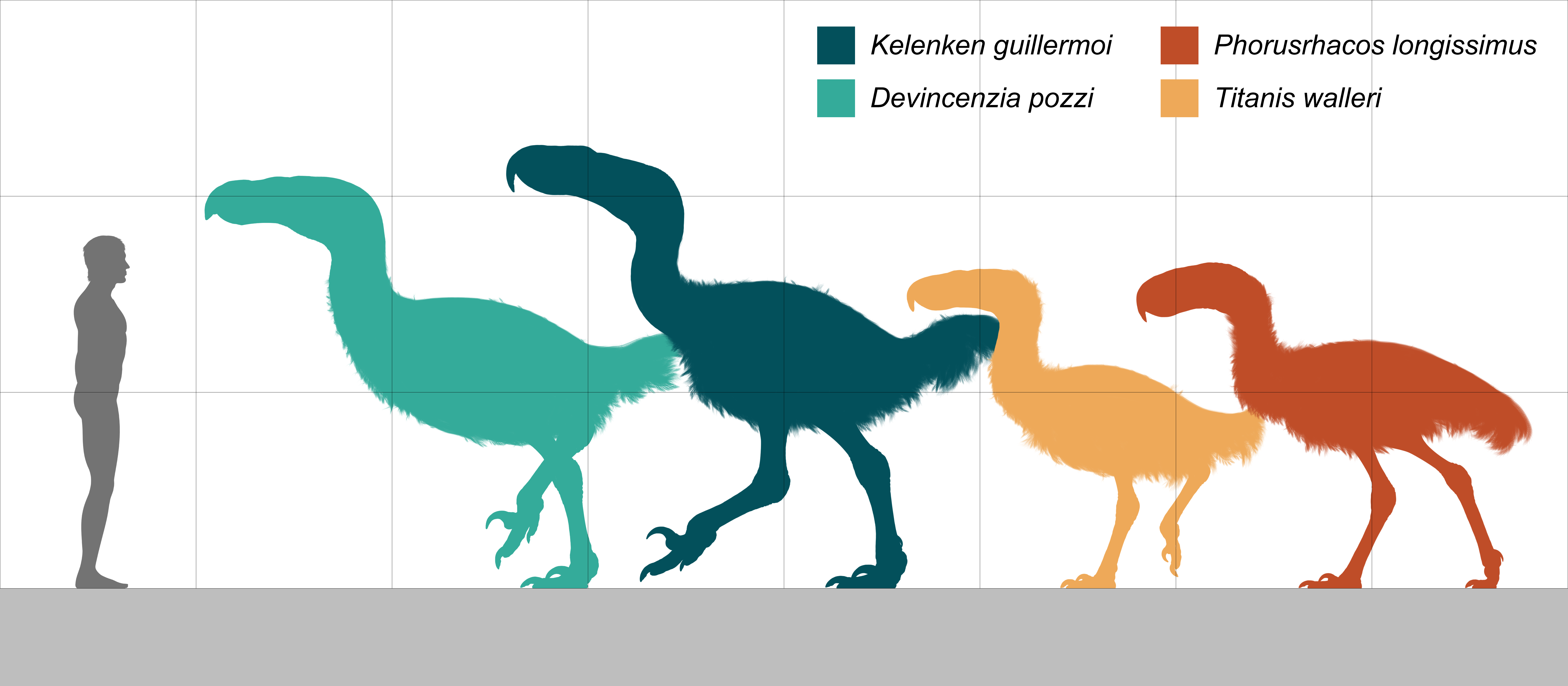
Size of Devincenzia (teal) compared to other phorusrhacines

Phorusrhacids were large, flightless birds with long hind limbs, narrow pelvises, proportionally small wings, and huge skulls, with a tall, long, sideways compressed hooked beak. Evidence of elongated quill-feathers is known from Patagornis and Llallawavis, with large tubercles called quill knobs present on their ulnae. These quill knobs would have supported long flight feathers. Overall, Devincenzia is larger and bulkier than its relatives Titanis and Phorusrhacos, representing one of the largest members of the family.

=== Skull ===
MLP 37-III-7-8 preserves parts of the rostrum and posterior (back) portions of the skull, but is lacking some of its beak. It generally resembles the skull of Kelenken, but is slightly smaller. When complete, it was around 64.5 centimetres (25.4 in) long and about the size of Phorusrhacos', but shorter than Kelenken's. Overall, it is wedge-shaped when viewed from above and it is widest at the occipital bone, at 32.3 centimetres (12.7 in) wide. The skull was flattened from top to bottom by taphonomy and the specimen contains extensive plaster reconstruction. At the back end of the skull on the left and right sides of the occipital condyle (the area where the skull articulates with the vertebrae) are two, extensively deep fossae (shallow depressions in bone) which were openings for the carotid and ophthalmic arteries. Unlike in other phorusrhacids, these fossae are bordered by large bony ridges. The ratio from height to width is about 39%, while in Phorusrhacos it is 47% and in Psilopterus it is 48%. The snout tapered towards the front, going from 24.4 centimetres (9.6 in) wide at the frontal bone to 19.1 centimetres (7.5 in) wide at the temporal fossa (a shallow depression on the side of the skull).

The sides of the beak tip have large accessory fossae (depressions in bone), like in many phorusrhacids, which runs for most of the rostrum. Above the orbit is the supraorbital, which is large and separated from the dorsal rim. Unlike those of Tolmodus and Psilopterus, Devincenzia preserve tall, extremely stocky postorbitals that extend above the margin of the rest of the skull. While Phorusrhacos', postorbital process is turned slightly downward, Devincenzia's and Kelenken's postorbital processes are steeply deflected. MLP 37-III-7-8 preserves the entire jugal, which is markedly robust, convex, and sigmoid-shaped, unlike the shallow jugals of Psilopterus and Tolmodus. While similar to Devincenzia's, Kelenken's jugals are deeper, flat instead of convex, and slightly shorter. Although a complete mandible is not known from Devincenzia, it likely had an elongated, robust dentary like other phorusrhacids. This is supported by its skull anatomy, as the rostrum is long and thin.

=== Postcrania ===
Distal tibiotarsi of several phorusrhacids compared, including Devincenzia (c)

The tarsometatarsus' anatomy is intermediary between the lithe phorusrhacines and the robust brontornithines (physornithines). However, the holotype of D. gallinali is not fully mature as demonstrated by its cortical bone, and is therefore less robust. The trochlea II and IV of the tarsometatarsus are not as separated as in Brontornis and are about the same length, unlike Phorusrhacos. However, they are strongly developed as in most phorusrgacids but not to the same extent as in smaller phorusrhacids or cariamids. Its shaft is also not as wide as Brontornis' and overall is less robust, but still more stocky than that of Phorusrhacos. Unlike Titanis, the tarsometatarsus of D. gallinali is wide at the distal end and has thick, expanded trochlea that measure about 3/4ths the width of the inner trochlea. Below the pons of the tibiotarsus is a pit which is known in all phorusrhacids, but is not as deep or evident as in many other genera. Its suclus extensorius is also deep, narrow, and located on the right side of the tibiotarsus. One tibiotarsus of D. pozzi, MACN 13243, which measures 7.4 centimetres (2.9 in) wide at the end, which is significantly wider than those of other phorusrhacids like Phorusrhacos, Mesembriornis, and Patagornis. However, it is about 18% smaller than MT-0200, an unnamed phorusrhacine from the La Venta Formation of Colombia.

A complete tibiotarsus of a phorusrhacine from the Early Pleistocene Raigón Formation of southern Uruguay was described by Argentine paleontologist Claude Tambussi and colleagues in 1999. Brazilian paleontologists Herculano Alvarenga and Elizabeth Höfling tentatively assigned the specimen to Devincenzia in 2003. The bone measures 72 centimetres (2.36 ft) long and 10.4 centimetres (0.34 ft) wide at the distal end, bigger than any tibiotarsi described from Phorusrhacos. Overall, it is similar to that of Phorusrhacos, but bears a deeper tendinal groove. The height and body mass of the specimen are estimated over 2 metres (6.6 ft) and 200–500 kilograms (440–1,100 lb), respectively, making it among the largest known phorusrhacids.

== Paleobiology ==
A mandible (lower jaw) fragment of D. pozz

Phorusrhacids are thought to have been ground predators or scavengers, and have often been considered apex predators that dominated Cenozoic South America in the absence of placental mammalian predators, though they did co-exist with some large, carnivorous borhyaenid mammals. Earlier hypotheses of phorusrhacid feeding ecology were mainly inferred from them having large skulls with hooked beaks rather than through detailed hypotheses and biomechanical studies, and such studies of their running and predatory adaptations were only conducted from the beginning of the 21st century. In general, phorusrhacids are separated into two primary ecological stances. Smaller, lithe genera like Psilopterus and Procariama are thought to have filled a sereima-like niche, feeding on smaller prey and potentially bearing limited flight abilities. Meanwhile, Devincenzia and other gigantic genera are presumed to have been macropredators and apex predators. Kelenken and Devincenzia were likely graviportal ambush hunters which relied on stealth to hunt, while Phorusrhacos is thought to have been a pursuit predator. Devincenzia fossils are overall similar to those of Phorusrhacos', but are larger and come from younger deposits in Uruguay and northern Argentina. Onactornis has been proposed to be a terrestrial scavenger, whereas Argentavis was the apex predator.

Holotype right tarsometatarsus of D. pozzi (A) compared to those of Phorusrhacos (B) and Titanis (C)

Alvarenga and Höfling suggested that phorusrhacids were flightless, as evidenced by the proportional size of their wings and body mass, and wing-size was more reduced in larger members of the group. These researchers pointed out that the narrowing of the pelvis, upper maxilla and thorax could have been adaptations to enable the birds to search for and take smaller animals in tall plant growth or broken terrain. The large expansions above the eyes formed by the lacrimal bones (similar to what is seen in modern hawks) would have protected the eyes against the sun, and enabled keen eyesight, which indicates they hunted by sight in open, sunlit areas, and not shaded forests.

=== Leg function ===
In 2005, Uruguayan paleontologists Rudemar Ernesto Blanco and Washington W. Jones examined the strength of the tibiotarsus (shin bone) of phorusrhacids to determine their speed, but conceded that such estimates can be unreliable even for extant animals. While the tibiotarsal strength of Patagornis and an indeterminate large phorusrhacine, possibly Devincenzia, suggested a speed of 14 m/s (50 km/h; 31 mph), and that of Mesembriornis suggested 27 m/s (97 km/h; 60 mph), the latter is greater than that of a modern ostrich, approaching that of a cheetah, 29 m/s (100 km/h; 65 mph). They found these estimates unlikely due to the large body size of these birds, and instead suggested the strength could have been used to break the long bones of medium-sized mammals, the size, for example, of a saiga or Thomson's gazelle. This strength could be used for accessing the marrow inside the bones, or by using the legs as kicking weapons (like some modern ground birds do), consistent with the large, curved, and sideways compressed claws known in some phorusrhacids. They also suggested future studies could examine whether they could have used their beaks and claws against well-armored mammals such as armadillos and glyptodonts.

According to Argentine paleontologists Luis Chiappe and Sara Bertelli in a 2006 article, the discovery of Kelenken shed doubt on the traditional idea that the size and agility of phorusrhacids correlated, with the larger members of the group being more bulky and less adapted for running. The long and slender tarsometatarsus of Kelenken, a phorusrhacid similar in size and proportions to Devincenzia, instead shows that this bird may have been much swifter than the smaller, more heavyset and slow Brontornis. In a 2006 news article about the discovery, Chiappe stated that while Kelenken may not have been as swift as an ostrich, it could clearly run faster than had previously been assumed for large phorusrhacids, based on the long, slender leg-bones, superficially similar to those of the modern, flightless rhea. The article suggested that Kelenken would have been able to chase down small mammals and reptiles.

=== Skull and neck function ===
A 2010 study by Degrange and colleagues of the medium-sized phorusrhacid Andalgalornis, a close relative of Devincenzia, based on Finite Element Analysis using CT scans, estimated its bite force and stress distribution in its skull. They found its bite force to be lower at 133 newtons at the bill tip, and showed it had lost a large degree of intracranial immobility (mobility of skull bones in relation to each other), as was also the case for other large phorusrhacids such as Devincenzia. This suggests that the skull was weak at the sides and midline, indicating that it was unlike that Andalgalornis engaged in risky behaviors, such as predating on large prey. Instead, the authors stated it either fed on smaller prey or used a repetitive striking motion with the beak to dispatch large animals. Struggling prey could also be restrained with the feet, despite the lack of sharp talons.

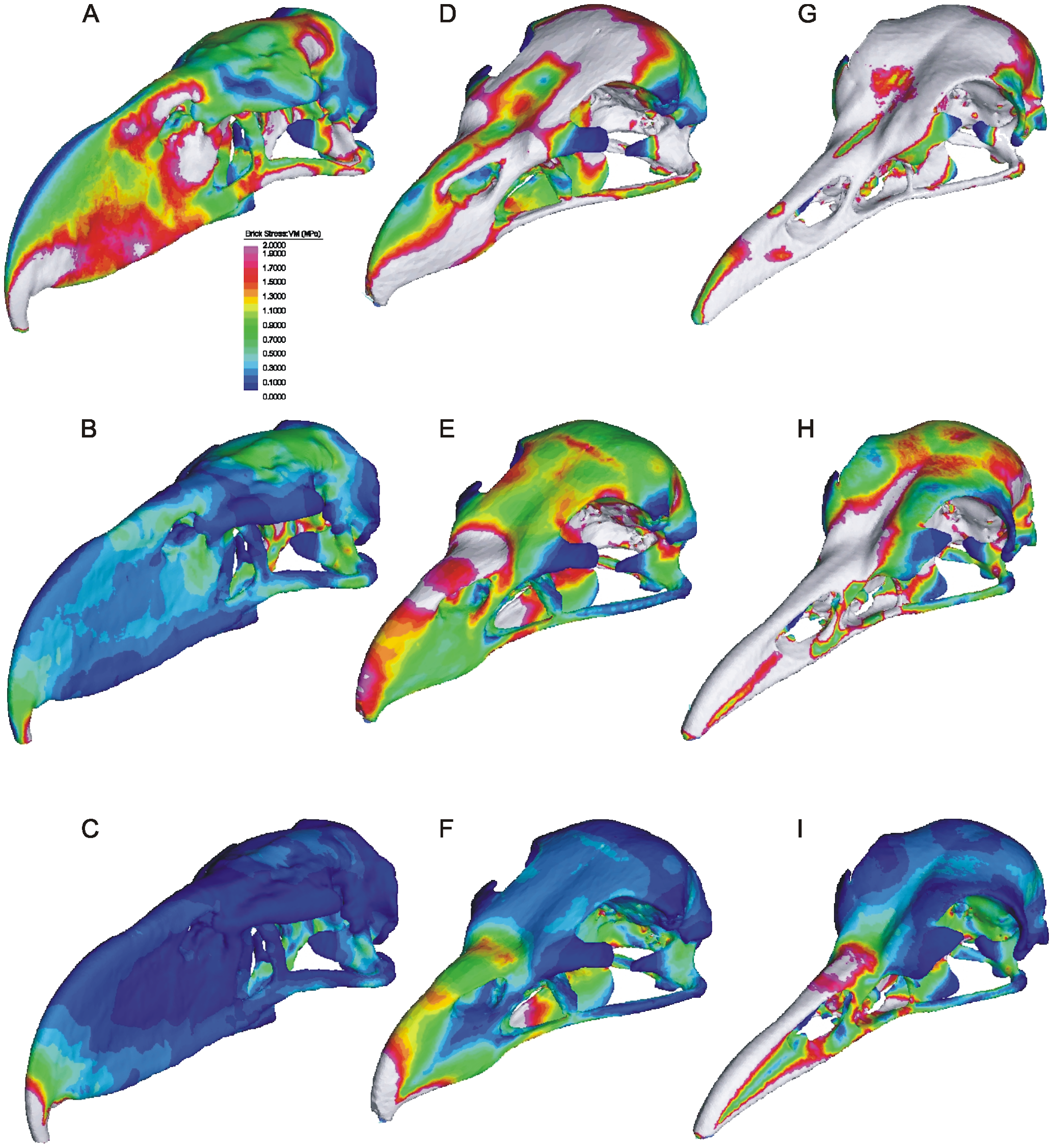
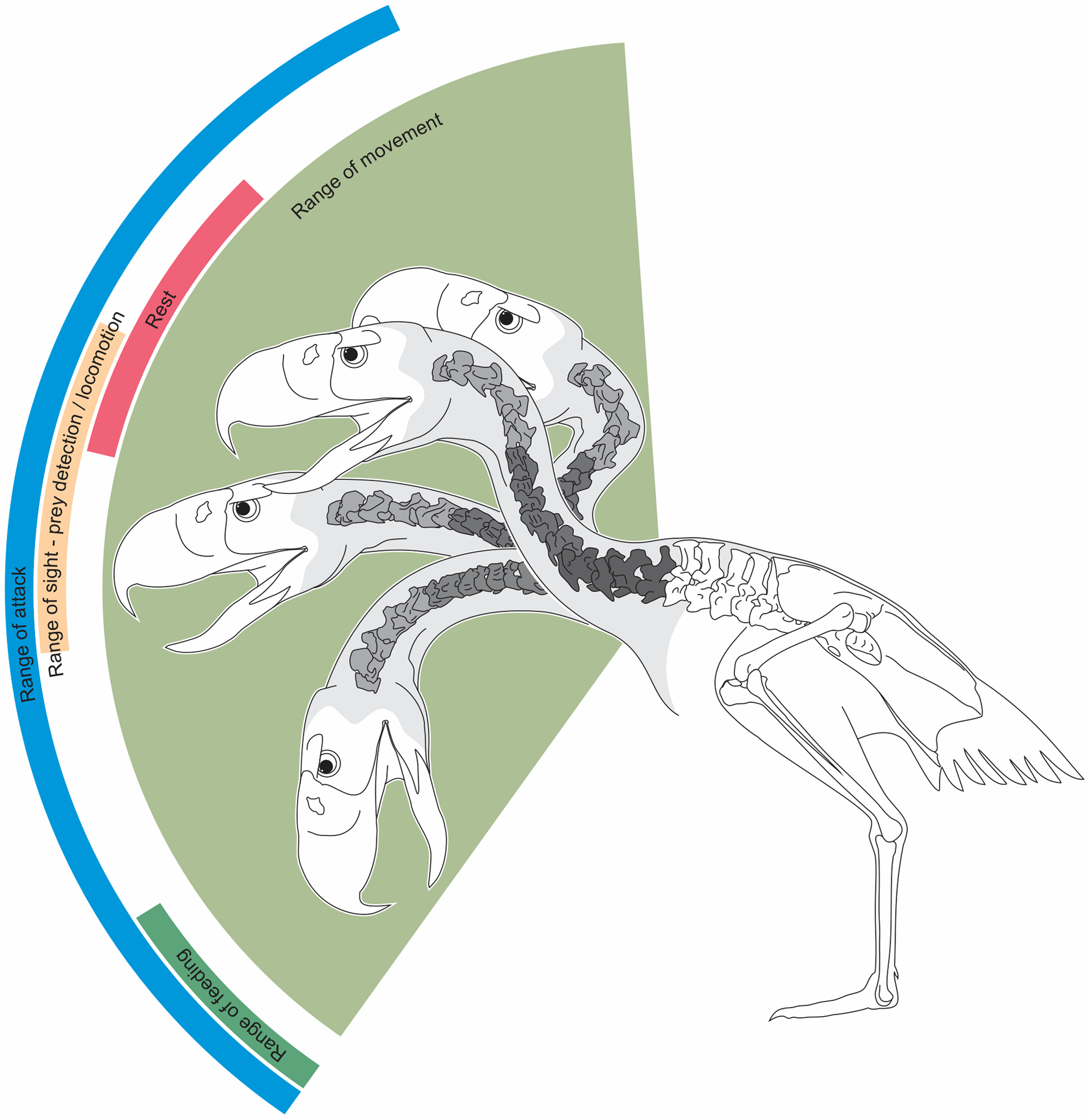
Stress distribution in bird skulls during various movements, including the related Andalgalornis (left, A–C, the other skulls belong to a red-legged seriema and a white-tailed eagle), and hypothetical upwards-and-downwards range of movement of the neck in the same genus (right)

A 2012 follow-up study by Tambussi and colleagues analyzed the flexibility of the neck of Andalgalornis, based on the morphology of its neck vertebrae, finding the neck to be divided into three sections. By manually manipulating the vertebrae, they concluded that the neck musculature and skeleton of Andalgalornis was adapted to carrying a large head, and for helping it rise from a maximum extension after a downwards strike, and the researchers assumed the same would be true for other large, big-headed phorusrhacids like Devincenzia. A 2020 study of phorusrhacid skull morphology by Degrange found that there were two main morphotypes within the group, derived from a seriema-like ancestor. These were the "Psilopterine Skull Type", which was plesiomorphic (more similar to the ancestral type), and the "Terror Bird Skull Type", which included Devincenzia and other phorusrhacines, that was more specialized, with more rigid and stiff skulls. Despite the differences, studies have shown the two types handled prey similarly, while the more rigid skulls and resulting larger bite force of the "Terror Bird" type would have been an adaptation to handling larger prey.

== Classification ==
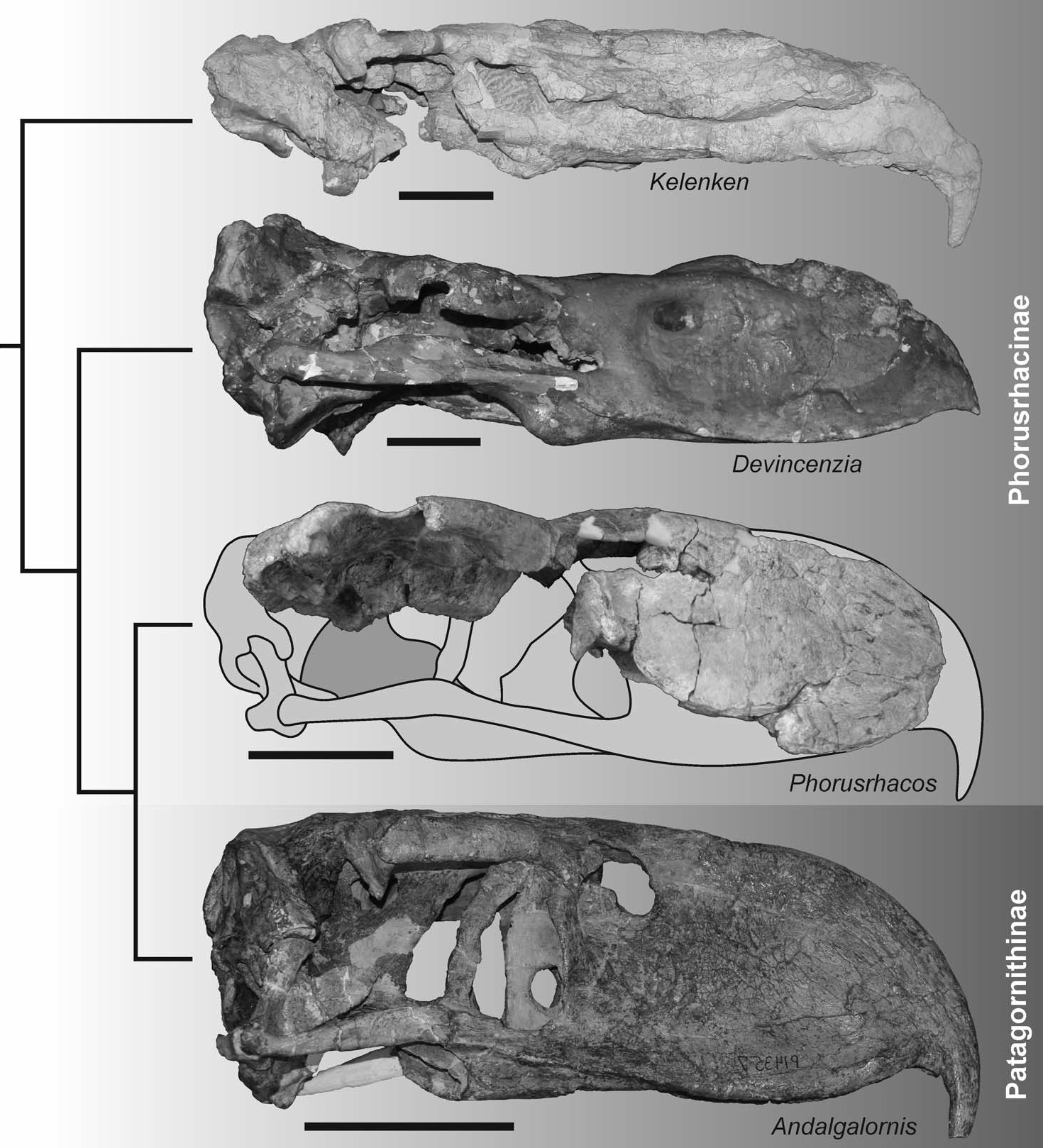
Skulls of phorusrhacines and Andalgalornis

Phorusrhacidae is an extinct group of flightless, carnivorous birds that occupied one of the dominant, large land-predator niches in South America from the lower Eocene to the Pleistocene. They dispersed into North America during the Great American Biotic Interchange (~3 Ma). Some remains from Africa and Europe and the Paleocene of Brazil have been assigned to this clade or identified as phylogenetically related to the extant South American seriemas, but these assignments remain controversial.

The interrelationships of Phorusrhacidae are unclear, partly due to their sparse fossil record. In his description of Devincenzia, Kraglievich (1932) dubbed Devincenziidae, a distinct family that included just Devincenzia. He stated it was allied with Psilopteridae, Phorusrhacidae, and Opisthodactylidae within Stereornithes, while Brontornithidae was in a separate order, Brontornithes, that was sister to Stereornithes. While Psilopteridae and Devincenziidae are now considered synonymous with Phorusrhacidae, Opisthodactylidae and Brontornithidae contained genera not included in Phorusrhacidae according to recent studies. Patterson and Kraglievich (1960) broke up Phororhacoidea (=Phorusrhacoidea) into two families: Psilopteridae, which featured the subfamilies Psilopterinae and Hermosiornithinae, and Phororhacidae (=Phorusrhacidae), which featured Phororhacinae (=Phorusrhacinae), which included Devincenzia, and Tolmodinae (=Patagornithinae). It was not until Brodkorb (1967) that Phororhacidae was corrected to Phorusrhacidae in literature. Furthermore, Brodkorb (1967) constricted Phorusrhacidae to the subfamilies Brontornithinae, Paleociconiinae, and Phorusrhacinae, which included Devincenzia.

In 2003, Brazilian paleontologists Herculano Alvarenga and Elizabeth Höfling published a revision of the family in which they recognized six subfamilies, including Phorusrhacinae, and defined each one. Devincenzia was included in Phorusrhacinae along with Phorusrhacos and Titanis. In a separate study, Alvarenga and colleagues (2011) performed a phylogenetic analysis (a study of the evolutionary relationships between organisms), which recovered Patagornithinae, Phorusrhacinae, and Physornithinae in a polytomy (an unnatural grouping) (topology 1). A later phylogenetic analysis by Degrange and colleagues (2015) found Phorusrhacidae to include Mesembrironithinae and Psilopterinae as distinct, while Patagornithinae, Phorusrhacinae, and Physornithinae is in polytomy (topology 2). Here, Devincenzia was united with Kelenken outside of the polytomy including patagornithines, phorusrhacines, and physornithines.

Topology 1: Alvarenga et al. (2011) results

- Phorusrhacidae
  - Mesembriornithinae
  - - Psilopterinae
    - - Patagornis
      - Andrewsornis
      - Andalgalornis
      - Phorusrhacos
      - Titanis
      - - Devincenzia
        - Kelenken
      - Brontornis
      - Physornis
      - Paraphysornis

Topology 2: Degrange et al. (2015) results

- Phorusrhacidae
  - - Mesembriornithinae
    - Psilopterinae
  - - Kelenken guillermoi
    - - Devincenzia pozzi
      - - Titanis walleri
        - - - Phorusrhacos longissimus
            - Andalgalornis steulleti
            - Andrewsornis abbotti
            - Patagornis marshi
            - Physornis fortis
          - Paraphysornis brasiliensis

The subfamily Phorusrhacinae includes Devincenzia in addition to genera like Phorusrhacos, Kelenken, and Titanis. Unnamed phorusrhacines have been described as well, including from the Pleistocene of Uruguay and the Miocene of Colombia. The name "Phorusrhacinae" was first used by Kraglievich (1932) and defined as including Phorusrhacos longissimus, Devincenzia gallinali, their descendents, and their most recent common ancestor. Patterson and Kraglievich (1960) characterized phorusrhacines by their large size, robust limbs, and cranial features observed in Devincenzia, with Kelenken and Titanis added in later works. While Phorusrhacos and Titanis are more basal, Kelenken and Devincenza are often recovered as sister taxa. Alvarenga and Höfling (2003) limited Phorusrhacinae to Phorusrhacos, Devincenzia, Kelenken, and Titanis. They defined (the traits taxa have to be considered members) Phorusrhacinae by the presence of an overall size and gigantic build, more lithe traits than Brontornithinae (a clade which may not be phorusrhacid), and a relatively elongated and slender tarsometatarsus, which is over 60% of the length of the tibiotarsus. Furthermore, a relatively long, narrow, and relatively dorsoventrally (top-bottom) short mandibular symphysis (the area where both mandibulae (lower jaws) meet) which measures over twice as long as the width of the base was considered a defining characteristic too.

In contrast, Agnolín (2009) expanded Phorusrhacinae to include Phorusrhacos, Andalgalornis, Devincenzia, Kelenken, Titanis, and the tribe Physornithini, which is composed of Physornis and Paraphysornis. He stated the group was distinguished from other phorusrhacids by the presence of a tall, robust postorbital process (an extension on the quadrate that interlocked with the postorbital bone) and a subrectangular antorbital fenestra (a gap in the skull in front of the orbit). Agnolín's stance was backed by a phylogenetic analysis, which found Kelenken and Devincenzia to be sister taxa. Similar to the results of Agnolín (2007), American paleontologists Thomas LaBarge and Chris Organ and British paleontologist Jacob Gardner (2024) recovered a broken up Phorusrhacinae, with only Titanis and Phorusrhacos being phorusrhacines. Although their analysis found Kelenken and Devincenzia as closer to Physornithi, La Barge, Organ, and Gardner (2024) stated that this may be a result of parallel evolution of robust traits, as Phorusrhacos was relatively gracile and cursorial. This led them to continue to include Devincenzia and Kelenken in the subfamily despite the results.

== Paleoenvironment ==
=== Ituzaingó Formation ===
Ortotherium is known from the Ituzaingó Formation, the fossils being deposited in a series of sediments made up of fine quartz gravel, clay, and chalcedony clasts called the "Conglomerado osifero". The strata of the Ituzaingó Formation date to the Late Miocene, a period in which animal biodiversity boomed in South America, with the advent of the faunas of formations such as the Santa Cruz, Pebas, Cerro Azul, and Urumaco strata. During the Late Miocene, water levels in South America rose and a selection of tropical habitats formed in large river basins such as the Pebas System and Paranese Sea, the latter bordering the Ituzaingó Formation. The Ituzaingó Formation's deposits are from the beaches of the Paranese Sea, transforming the environment into a subtropical one, as demonstrated by the strata's paleoflora and paleofauna. The paleoflora is diverse, but includes the aquatic mangroves and terrestrial legumes, bamboos, flowering shrubs, and more. Bamboos, coconut palms, and other palms were very common. Its flora also included savannas in addition to the coastal, riverine, and tropical regions. Its freshwater vertebrate fauna overlaps with the existing freshwater vertebrate fauna of the Amazon at the time, suggesting that they may have been connected by waterways. The mammalian faunal composition is very similar to that of the Arroyo Chasicó and Urumaco Formations. In Ituzaingó waterways lived a menagerie of fish, such as catfish, perciformes, acanthuriformes, and characiformes, amphibians like Leptodactylus, and the iniid river dolphins Saurocetes and Ischyrorhynchus. A diverse array of mostly semiaquatic reptiles like the gavialid crocodilian Gryposuchus, the caimans Caiman australis, Purussaurus, and Mourasuchus, the turtle Phrynops, and the tortoise Chelonoidis have been described.

Mammalian hebivores included the notoungulate toxodontids Dinotoxodon and Adinotherium, the interatheriid Protypotherium, the litopterns Brachytherium, Diadiaphorus, and Paranauchenia, and the ground sloths Octomylodon and Protomegalonyx. Terrestrial carnivores included the other phorusrhacid Andalgalornis, the sparassodonts Thylacosmilus and Stylocynus, the marsupials Philander entrerianus and Chironectes, the procyonid carnivoran Cyonasua, and the armadillo Macroeuphractus. Other armadilos known from the formation include the glyptodonts Eleutherocercus, Palaehoplophorus, and Plohophorus, the pampatheres Kraglievichia and Scirrotherium, the chlamyphorid Zaedyus, and the nine-banded armadillo relative Dasypus neogaeus.

=== Cerro Azul Formation ===
Fossils of Onactornis depressus, a possible synonym of Devincenzia, were found in strata of the Cerro Azul Formation. The lithology of the formation is made up of very fine sandstones and siltstones, which were likely deposited by a plains environment that had few rivers and lakes. Parts of the environment were marked by floodplains, which occasionally experienced flash floods that buried vertebrate remains. Based on its fauna and stratigraphy, the Cerro Azul Formation dates to between 10 and 5.8-5.7 million years old. In the Miocene, the Cerro Azul had a neotropical climate and harbored animals adapted for warm climates like frogs, turtles, and snakes.

During the same expedition that discovered the Onactornis depressus holotype, remains of several litopterns, such as the macraucheniid Huayqueriania, the proterothere Eoauchenia, and several mesotheriids like Pseudotypotherium and Typotheriopsis, were collected. Many xenarthran fossils coming from the glyptodont Coscinocercus and ground sloths, Proscelidodon and Mcdonaldocnus were also discovered. Other birds from the formation include the giant teratorn Argentavis, the other phorusrhacid Procariama, the rhea, and indeterminate species of the tinamous Eudromia and Nothura. Mammals are the most common and diverse ngroup found in the formation. This included herbivorous notoungulates like the hegetotheriids Hemihegetotherium, Paedotherium, and Tremacyllus, and the toxodont Pisanodon, rodents like Lagostomus and Neophanomys, and litopterns like Diplasiotherium and Neobrachytherium. Other mammals have been discovered like the armadillos Macrochorobates and Proeuphractus, the marsupials Argyrolagus, Zygolestes, Dimartinia, and Thylacosmilus, and the carnivoran Cyonasua.
