= Eschatornis =

Eschatornis Temporal range: Late Pleistocene ~0.025 Ma

Scientific classification
- Kingdom: Animalia
- Phylum: Chordata
- Class: Aves
- Order: Cariamiformes
- Family: †Phorusrhacidae
- Genus: †Eschatornis; Machado et al., 2026
- Species: †E. aterradora

Binomial name
- †Eschatornis aterradora Machado et al., 2026

Extinct genus of birds

Eschatornis (lit. 'last bird') is an extinct genus of phorusrhacid (terror bird) from the Late Pleistocene of northeastern Brazil. The genus contains a single species, Eschatornis aterradora, known from a partial left tibiotarsus, a primary lower leg bone of birds. It is the first purported Late Pleistocene phorusrhacid fossil to be directly dated using radiocarbon dating, approximately 25,326-25,733 calibrated (cal.) years Before Present, possibly extending the known occurrence of phorusrhacids during the Pleistocene epoch.

== Discovery and naming ==
The Eschatornis holotype specimen, MCL-A-1.795, was discovered and collected by Cástor Cartelle in the Toca dos Ossos cave of the Caatinga Formation in Bahia, Brazil. The fossil consists of an incomplete distal (lower) half of a left tibiotarsus. It was first tentatively classified as an indeterminate species of the family Cathartidae (New world vultures) by the Brazilian ornithologist Herculano Alvarenga and colleagues in 2008 pending further examination.

In 2026, the Brazilian paleontologist Victor Hugo M. Machado and colleagues redescribed this fossil as a new genus and species of psilopterine phorusrhacid, Eschatornis aterradora. The generic name, Eschatornis, is derived from the Greek word ἔσχατος (éschatos, "last") and the Latin word ornis meaning "bird", since this taxon possibly represents the latest known phorusrhacid at the time of description. The Latinized specific name, aterradora, is derived from the word meaning "terrifying" in Portuguese and Spanish, in reference to the popular name of phorusrhacids, the terror birds.

== Description ==
The holotype of Eschatornis is estimated to have weighed approximately or less than 6.1 kg (13 lb) based on minimal tibiotarsus circumference, similar in size to the related Psilopterus. The specimen is relatively larger and more robust than the tibiotarsus of seriemas, the closest extant relatives of the extinct phorusrhachids. The morphology (shape) of the tibiotarsus is consistent with that of the family Phorusrhacidae, especially resembling that of the relatively small-sized subfamilies Psilopterinae and Mesembriornithinae.

Re-examination in 2026 noted that some of the features in the distal end of the tibiotarsus, originally used for its tentative identification as a cathartid in 2008, are also found in phorusrhacids such as the supratendinal bridge (critical bony bridge) being oblique, albeit to a lesser extent than that of Psilopterus, and the oval opening on the extensor sulcus (shallow groove). The medial edge of the sulcus is straight like that of Psilopterus, and the lateral condyle, articular bony projection at the proximal (upper) end, of the tibiotarsus is rounded unlike that of cathartids which is more projected upwards. The medial epicondyle, inner bony protrusions on the distal end, of the tibiotarsus is long and oriented in a vertical direction like that of Patagornis, and more proximally positioned and extended towards the center than that of Psilopterus and seriemas.

== Paleoenvironment ==
The describers of Eschatornis performed direct radiocarbon dating of the holotype using its bioapatite sample (natural mineral component of the bone), which were subsequently converted to collagen and calibrated, resulting in an age estimate of 25,326-25,733 cal. years Before Present. This represents the first direct dating of the purported Late Pleistocene phorusrhacid fossil, providing strong support to the argument that psilopterine phorusrhacids survived up to near the end of this epoch. In contrast, the other potential Late Pleistocene phorusrhacid specimens from Uruguay were indirectly dated based on nearby fossil from the locality or maximum depositional age, with the validity of the age estimate by Alvarenga et al. (2010) being questionable.

The fossils in the Toca dos Ossos cave, including the holotype of Eschatornis, were likely transported and deposited by stream sink runoff rather than concentrated accumulation over time based on their association with fluvial sediments, suggesting that most of the skeletal remains were likely removed in the process as evidenced by the locality lacking articulated skeletons. Carbon isotope signature obtained from the holotype suggested that Eschatornis lived in a mesic, arboreal savannah (mixed woodland-grassland) habitat rich in C_{3} plants. Eschatornis likely occupied a mesopredator niche in its biome, predating on smaller animals to avoid competition with larger, coeval apex predators.

Extinct mammals discovered from the Toca dos Ossos cave include the large proboscidean Notiomastodon, saber-toothed cat Smilodon, various species of ground sloths, cingulatans Pampatherium and Glyptodon, large toxodontid notoungulates Toxodon and Trigonodops, large litoptern Xenorhinotherium, equids Equus neogeus and Hippidion, camelids Palaeolama and Hemiauchenia, extinct tapir Tapirus cristatellus, large rodent Neochoerus, and large vampire bat Desmodus draculae. Fossils of extant mammals discovered from the Toca dos Ossos cave include the cougar, jaguar, ocelot, collared peccary, white-tailed deer, gray brocket, Brazilian three-banded armadillo, prehensile-tailed porcupine, capybara, coypu, neotropical otter, striped hog-nosed skunk, giant anteater, southern tamandua, and howler monkey.
