= 1974 in paleontology =

Paleontology or palaeontology is the study of prehistoric life forms on Earth through the examination of plant and animal fossils. This includes the study of body fossils, tracks (ichnites), burrows, cast-off parts, fossilised feces (coprolites), palynomorphs and chemical residues. Because humans have encountered fossils for millennia, paleontology has a long history both before and after becoming formalized as a science. This article records significant discoveries and events related to paleontology that occurred or were published in the year 1974.

== Bryophytes ==
Name	Novelty	Status	Authors	Age	Unit	Location	Notes	Images
Ditrichites	Gen et sp nov	valid	Kuc	Ypresian	Allenby Formation	Canada; British Columbia	A possible ditrichaceous moss. The type species is D. fylesi	
Muscites maycocki	Sp nov	valid	Kuc	Ypresian	Allenby Formation	Canada; British Columbia	A moss of uncertain placement	
Muscites ritchiei	Sp nov	valid	Kuc	Ypresian	Allenby Formation	Canada; British Columbia	A moss of uncertain placement	
Palaeohypnum jovet-asti	Sp nov	jr synonym	Kuc	Ypresian	Allenby Formation	Canada; British Columbia	An amblystegiaceous moss Moved to Hypnites jovet-astiae in 1980	
Palaeohypnum steerei	Sp nov	jr synonym	Kuc	Ypresian	Allenby Formation	Canada; British Columbia	An amblystegiaceous moss Moved to Hypnites steerei in 1980	

== Plants ==
=== Angiosperms ===
Name	Novelty	Status	Authors	Age	Unit	Location	Notes	Images
Quercus paleocarpa	Gen et sp nov	valid	Manchester	Middle Eocene	Clarno Formation	US; Oregon	An oak	

== Archosauromorphs ==
=== General research ===
- Massospondylus gastroliths are documented.

=== Newly named dinosaurs ===
Data courtesy of George Olshevsky's dinosaur genera list.

Name	Novelty	Status	Authors	Age	Unit	Location	Notes	Images
Chubutisaurus	gen et sp nov	Valid	del Corro	Albian	Cerro Barcino Formation	Argentina		Chubutisaurus
Homalocephale	gen et sp nov	Valid	Maryańska & Osmólska	late Cretaceous		Mongolia		Homalocephale
Labocania	gen et sp nov	Valid	Molnar	Campanian	La Bocana Roja Formation	Mexico	possible tyrannosauroid	Labocania anomala
Prenocephale	gen et sp nov	Valid	Maryańska & Osmólska	late Cretaceous		Mongolia		Prenocephale
Stokesosaurus	gen et sp nov	Valid	Madsen	Late Jurassic	Morrison Formation, Utah	US Utah		Stokesosaurus langhami
Tylocephale	gen et sp nov	Valid	Maryańska & Osmólska	late Cretaceous		Mongolia		Tylocephale

=== Newly named birds ===
Name	Novelty	Status	Authors	Age	Unit	Location	Notes	Images
Chunga incerta	Sp. nov.	Valid	Eduardo P. Tonni	Late Pliocene	Monte Hermoso Formation	Argentina	A Cariamidae.	
Cryptociconia indica	Gen. nov. et Sp. nov.	Valid	Colin J. O. Harrison	Pliocene	Siwalik Series	India	A Ciconiidae, this is the type species of the new genus.	
Dendrocopos praemedius	Sp. nov.	Valid	Dénes Jánossy	Late Pliocene	MN 17	Austria	A Picidae.	
Francolinus minor	Sp. nov.	Valid	Dénes Jánossy	Late Pleistocene	Villafranchian	Poland	A Phasianidae.	
Francolinus villanyiensis	Sp. nov.	Valid	Dénes Jánossy	Late Pliocene	MN 16	Poland	A Phasianidae.	
Francolinus wenzensis	Sp. nov.	Valid	Dénes Jánossy	Early Pliocene	MN 15	Poland	A Phasianidae.	
Gobipteryx minuta	Gen. nov. et Sp. nov.	Valid	Andrzej Elzanowski	Late Cretaceous	?Campanian, Barun Goyot Formation	Mongolia	Described in the Palaeognathae, but transferred to the Enantiornithes Walker, 1981, this is the type species of the new genus.	
Leptoptilos richae	Sp. nov.	Valid	Colin J. O. Harrison	Late Miocene	Belgia Formation	Tunisia	A Ciconiidae.	
Leptoptilos siwalikensis	Sp. nov.	Valid	Colin J. O. Harrison	Pliocene	Siwalik Series	India	A Ciconiidae.	
Neophrontops slaughteri	Sp. nov.	Valid	Alan Feduccia	Late Pliocene	Glenns Ferry Formatie, Hagerman Local Fauna	US (Idaho)	An Accipitridae.	
Nesotrochis steganinos	Sp. nov.	Valid	Storrs L. Olson	Quaternary	Cave deposits	Haiti	A flightless Rallidae.	
Pachydyptes simpsoni	Sp. nov.	Valid	R. J. F Jenkins	Late Eocene	Blanche Point Marls, Aldingan Stage	Australia	A Spheniscidae.	
Tetrao conjugens	Sp. nov.	Valid	Dénes Jánossy	Late Pliocene	?Campanian, Węże 1	Poland	A Phasianidae.	
Tetrastes praebonasia	Sp. nov.	Valid	Dénes Jánossy	Early Pleistocene	Tarkö - lagen 11, 12; Hundsheim; Montoussé	Austria; France; Hungary	A Phasianidae, transferred to the genus Bonasa Stephen, 1819 by Zygmunt Bocheński, 1991.	

=== Newly named pterosaurs ===
Name	Novelty	Status	Authors	Age	Unit	Location	Notes	Images
Gallodactylus	gen et sp nov	subjective synonym	Fabre	Late Jurassic		France	subjective synonym of Cycnorhamphus	Cycnorhamphus suevicus
Herbstosaurus	gen et sp nov	Valid	Casamiquela	Tithonian	Vaca Muerta Formation	Argentina		
