= Miocariama =

Miocariama Temporal range: Early Miocene–Late Pliocene

Scientific classification
- Kingdom: Animalia
- Phylum: Chordata
- Class: Aves
- Order: Cariamiformes
- Family: Cariamidae
- Genus: †Miocariama; Noriega and Mayr, 2017
- Species: †M. patagonica

Binomial name
- †Miocariama patagonica Noriega and Mayr, 2017

Extinct species of bird

Miocariama is an extinct genus of seriema that lived in the Early Miocene and Late Pliocene. The only species in the genus is Miocariama patagonica. It was discovered in the Santa Cruz Formation of the Aquitanian stage in the Miocene, and is the oldest known species within Cariamidae.

In 2009, Noriega, Vizcaíno, and Bargo described Cariama santacrucensis based on a skull that they interpreted as belonging to a unique seriema taxon. Later that year, Federico Agnolín interpreted the remains as belonging to a distinct, non-cariamid genus, for which he proposed the new name Noriegavis. Mayr and Noriega referred a more complete specimen to Noriegavis santacrucensis in 2015. However, later study of these fossils by Noriega and Mayr indicated the original holotype instead belongs to the genus Thegornis (a falconid), so the second specimen, maintained as a seriema, was given a new scientific name, Miocariama patagonica.
