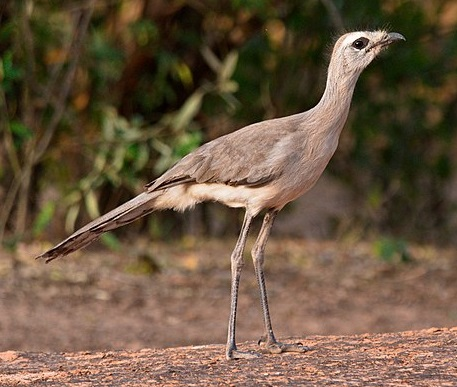

Conservation status
- Least Concern (IUCN 3.1)

Scientific classification
- Kingdom: Animalia
- Phylum: Chordata
- Class: Aves
- Order: Cariamiformes
- Family: Cariamidae
- Genus: Chunga
- Species: C. burmeisteri

Binomial name
- Chunga burmeisteri (Hartlaub, 1860)

Synonyms
- Dicholophus burmeisteri Hartlaub, 1860

= Black-legged seriema =

Species of bird

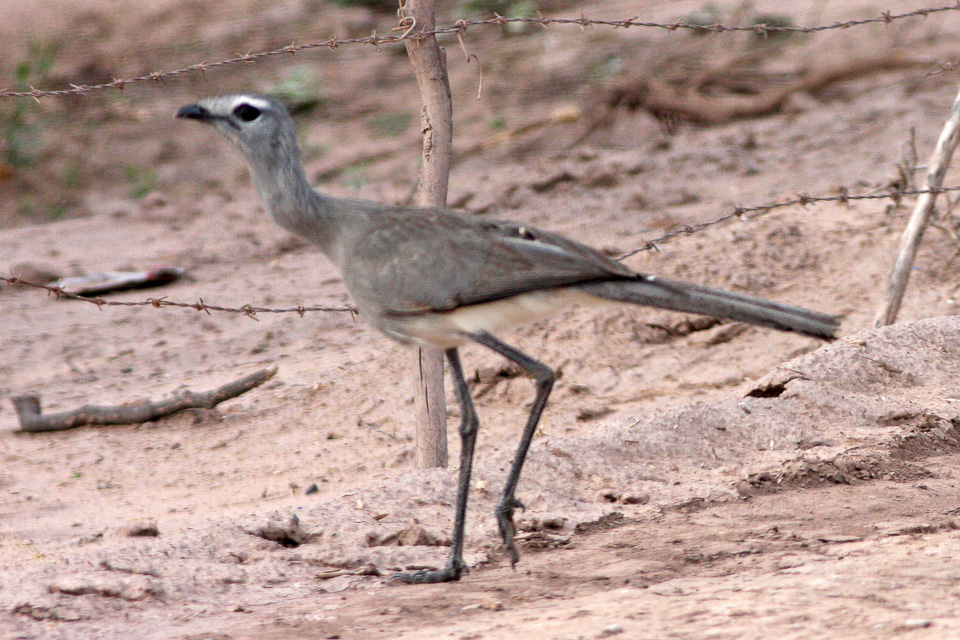

The black-legged seriema (Chunga burmeisteri) is one of two living species of seriemas in the family Cariamidae. It is found from southeastern Bolivia and northern Paraguay south into north-central Argentina. It is a large, mostly grey bird with a long neck, a long tail, and long, slender black legs. Its belly, vent and thighs are yellowish-white. The sexes look similar, as do immature birds, though the latter are more patterned on head, neck and back. First described for science by Gustav Hartlaub in 1860, it is monotypic, with no subspecies. Like its red-legged cousin, it is an omnivore. It seldom flies, instead pursuing prey and eluding danger on foot. Its loud calls, said to sound like kookaburras, turkeys or yelping dogs, are often given in duet. Little is known about its breeding ecology. It is known to breed in November and December, building a platform nest of sticks and laying two white eggs, which are sometimes marked with a few brownish or purple spots. The International Union for Conservation of Nature rates the species as one of least concern, due to its large range and apparently stable numbers.

== Taxonomy ==
German ornithologist Gustav Hartlaub first described the black-legged seriema for science in 1860, using information passed to him by Hermann Burmeister, another German zoologist who was living and working in South America at the time. Hartlaub named it Dicholophus burmeisteri. Both Hartlaub and Burmeister suggested that Chunga be established as a subgenus of Dicholophus, the genus which already contained the red-legged seriema, based on small differences between the species. However, it was quickly elevated to the status of a full genus. The black-legged seriema, which has no subspecies, is the only extant species in the genus. The other member of the genus, Chunga incerta, lived in the mid to late Pliocene. The black-legged seriema and its close relative the red-legged seriema are the only two living members of the small family Cariamidae.

The genus name Chunga comes directly from the name given to the black-legged seriema by Spanish residents of Argentina. The species name burmeisteri honors Hermann Burmeister, who had provided Hartlaub with information about the bird. "Seriema" is a Latinized word, invented in the mid-19th century and taken directly from the Tupi word siriema, which means "crested".

== Description ==
The black-legged seriema is a large bird, measuring some 70–85 cm (28–33 in) in length, and weighing roughly 1.2 kg (2.6 lb). This makes it one of the largest ground-dwelling birds in the Neotropics; only the red-legged seriema and the rheas are larger. It is long-necked and long-tailed, with very long, slender legs and short, rounded wings. Overall, it is ash-grey in colour, though closer examination shows that the "grey" body feathers are actually finely vermiculated with black and white. It has an inconspicuous frontal crest, composed of erect, hairlike bristles. It has whitish supercilia and lores, and the feathers on its crown and nape are barred in black and white. Its belly is paler grey, and its lower abdomen, crissum and thighs are yellowish-white. The flight feathers on the wings are thickly barred with black and white, and its grey tail is barred and narrowly tipped with black. Its feathers are loosely webbed, giving the bird a "soft" appearance. Those on its nape are particularly long, forming an inconspicuous crest. Its stout black bill has a strongly decurved culmen and a small hook at the tip. Its iris is reddish-brown, and its legs are dark-grey to black. Its feet have three short front toes with very sharp claws, and one small elevated hind toe which also found on Dromaeosauridae. The sexes look alike, and youngsters are similar, though somewhat more patterned. The latters' heads, necks and breasts are barred, and their backs and upperwing coverts are speckled with white.

=== Vocalisations ===
Its call notes are a series of yelps and barks, said to sound like a turkey, a kookaburra or a small dog. Pairs call in tandem, with the duet said to be loud, slow and evenly-pitched, but somewhat harsh and unmusical.

=== Similar species ===
The only species that the black-legged seriema could conceivably be confused with is the red-legged seriema. Though similar in general appearance, the black-legged seriema is smaller, and lacks the distinctive frontal crest of its red-legged cousin. It has a black bill and dark legs, rather than a red bill and red legs, and a dark eye rather than a pale one. Although the two overlap locally in their ranges, they tend to live in different habitats.

== Distribution and habitat ==
Found from southeastern Bolivia and northern Paraguay south into north-central Argentina, the black-legged seriema is a dry-country bird of savanna, shrubland and dry, open forest, including the Dry Chaco and the Monte Desert. Perhaps surprisingly, the species was not known from Bolivia until the late 1970s. It is generally found at elevations below 800 m (2,600 ft), lower than the elevations at which the red-legged seriema is typically found. Though it will forage in untreed areas, including cultivated fields and grassy plains, it only does so when there are wooded areas nearby.

== Behaviour ==
The black-legged seriema spends much of its time on the ground, and flies only reluctantly. It is a fast runner, and typically chases prey and eludes predators on foot. If pressed, it is capable of short flight – rapid flapping, followed by a glide. It sometimes flies up into trees, though it will preferentially jump to lower branches. Although it is primarily a sedentary species, some local movements may occur. In Paraguay, for example, it is known to move out of some areas of the chaco in response to cooler weather.

=== Food and feeding ===
Black-legged seriemas are omnivorous. Insects, particularly beetles and locusts, make up a significant portion of their diet, and they take the occasional rodent. They also eat plant material, including leaves, grass and seeds. They often hunt around the feet of livestock, which presumably flush insects as they move.

=== Breeding ===
The breeding behaviour of the black-legged seriema is not well-known. It is thought to breed primarily from November into December. It nests solitarily, with both members of the pair building a platform of sticks in a tree. The female lays two white eggs, which measure 56–61 mm (2.2–2.4 in) x 42–46 mm (1.7–1.8 in) and may have a few brown or pale purple spots.

== Relationship with humans ==
Indigenous peoples within the black-legged seriema's range hunt seriemas and collect their eggs for food. This has occurred from prehistoric times through as recently as 2003. The Toba people of Argentina make a poultice of the bird's manure to treat boils and abscesses.

== Conservation status ==
Because of the black-legged seriema's very large range and apparently stable population, the International Union for Conservation of Nature considers it be a species of least concern. Although its numbers have not been quantified, it is said to be "fairly common" throughout its range in Argentina. Its status in Bolivia and Paraguay is not well-documented. It is potentially impacted by habitat loss and fragmentation. One study in Argentina found the bird disappeared from parts of its former range once the forest had been fragmented into plots of less than 280 ha (690 acres).

It is known to harbour the chewing louse species Tinamotaecola wardi, Tinamotaecola andinae, Colpocephalum cristatae and Colpocephalum caudatum.

== Citations ==
=== References ===
- Altrichter, Mariana (July 2006). "Wildlife in the life of local people of the semi-arid Argentine Chaco". Biodiversity and Conservation. 15 (8): 2719–2736. Bibcode:2006BiCon..15.2719A. doi:10.1007/s10531-005-0307-5. S2CID 24495523.
- BirdLife International (2016). "Black-legged Seriema: Chunga burmeisteri". IUCN Red List of Threatened Species. 2016 e.T22692208A93341490. doi:10.2305/IUCN.UK.2016-3.RLTS.T22692208A93341490.en.
- Blake, Emmet Reid (1977). Manual of Neotropical Birds. Vol. 1: Spheniscidae (Penguins) to Laridae (Gulls and Allies). Chicago: University of Chicago Press. ISBN 978-0-226-05641-8.
- Boyle, Howarth S. (July 1917). "Field Notes on the Seriema (Chunga burmeisteri)" (PDF). The Auk. 34 (3): 294–296. doi:10.2307/4072213. JSTOR 4072213.
- Brooks, Daniel M. (June 2014). "Ecological notes on Seriema species in the Paraguayan Chaco, with observations on Chunga biology" (PDF). Revista Brasileira de Ornitologia. 22 (2): 234–237. doi:10.1007/BF03544250.
- Catanach, Terese A.; Valim, Michel P.; Weckstein, Jason D. & Johnson, Kevin P. (January 2018). "Cophylogenetic analysis of lice in the Colpocephalum complex (Phthiraptera: Amblycera)". Zoologica Scripta. 47 (1): 72–83. doi:10.1111/zsc.12262. S2CID 90062707.
- Cicchino, Armando C.; Valim, Michel P. & González-Acuña, Daniel (2014). "A review of the louse genus Tinamotaecola (Insecta: Phthiraptera: Philopteridae sensu lato), with description of a new species". Zootaxa. 3835 (3): 349–363. doi:10.11646/zootaxa.3835.3.4. hdl:11336/26975. PMID 25081457.
- Dardanelli, Sebastián; Nores, María Laura; Nores, Manuel (November 2006). "Minimum area requirements of breeding birds in fragmented woodland of Central Argentina". Diversity and Distributions. 12 (6): 687–693. Bibcode:2006DivDi..12..687D. doi:10.1111/j.1472-4642.2006.00266.x. S2CID 84720677.
- del Papa, Luis M. (11 January 2016). "Opportunistic use of tortoises (Chelonoidis chilensis) in a site of the Chaco-Santiagueña region (Province of Santiago del Estero, Argentina)". Quaternary International. 391: 74–81. Bibcode:2016QuInt.391...74D. doi:10.1016/j.quaint.2015.08.046.
- Gill, Frank; Donsker, David & Rasmussen, Pamela (2021). "Seriemas, falcons". IOC World Bird List. International Ornithological Congress.
- Gonzaga, Luiz P. (1996). "Family Cariamidae (Seriemas)". In del Hoyo, Josep; Elliott, Andrew; Sargatal, Jordi (eds.). Handbook of the birds of the World. Vol. 3: Hoatzin to Auks. Barcelona: Lynx Edicions. ISBN 84-87334-20-2.
- Hartlaub, Gustav (1860). "On a new grallatorial bird nearly allied to the Caraima (Dicholophus burmeisteri)". Proceedings of the Zoological Society of London (in English and Latin). 28.
- Martínez, Gustavo J.; Barboza, Gloria E. (28 October 2010). "Natural pharmacopoeia used in traditional Toba medicine for the treatment of parasitosis and skin disorders (Central Chaco, Argentina)". Journal of Ethnopharmacology. 132 (1): 86–100. doi:10.1016/j.jep.2010.07.049. hdl:11336/41161. PMID 20678567.
- Pearman, Mark; Areta, Juan Ignacio (2020). Field Guide to the Birds of Argentina and the Southwest Atlantic. London: Helm. ISBN 978-1-4729-8433-3.
- "Seriema". Lexico. Oxford Dictionary. 2021. Archived from the original on 23 May 2021.
- Schmitt, C. Gregory; Cole, Donna C. (May 1981). "First records of black-legged seriema (Chunga burmeisteri) in Bolivia" (PDF). The Condor. 83 (2): 182–183. doi:10.2307/1367427. JSTOR 1367427.
- Tambussi, Claudia; Ubilla, Martin; Acosta Hospitaleche, Carolina & Perea, Daniel (May 2005). "Fossil records and palaeoenvironmental implications of Chloephaga picta (Gmelin, 1789) (Magellan Goose) and Cariama cristata (Linnaeus, 1766) (Seriema) from the Late Pleistocene of Uruguay". Neues Jahrbuch für Geologie und Paläontologie - Monatshefte. 2005 (5): 257–268. doi:10.1127/njgpm/2005/2005/257.
- Thompson, Gordon T. (1938). "XXIX—The Piaget collection of mallophaga—Part II". Annals and Magazine of Natural History. 1 (3): 268–271. doi:10.1080/00222933808526765.
