= Parque das Aves =

Coordinates: 25.6140°S 54.4826°W

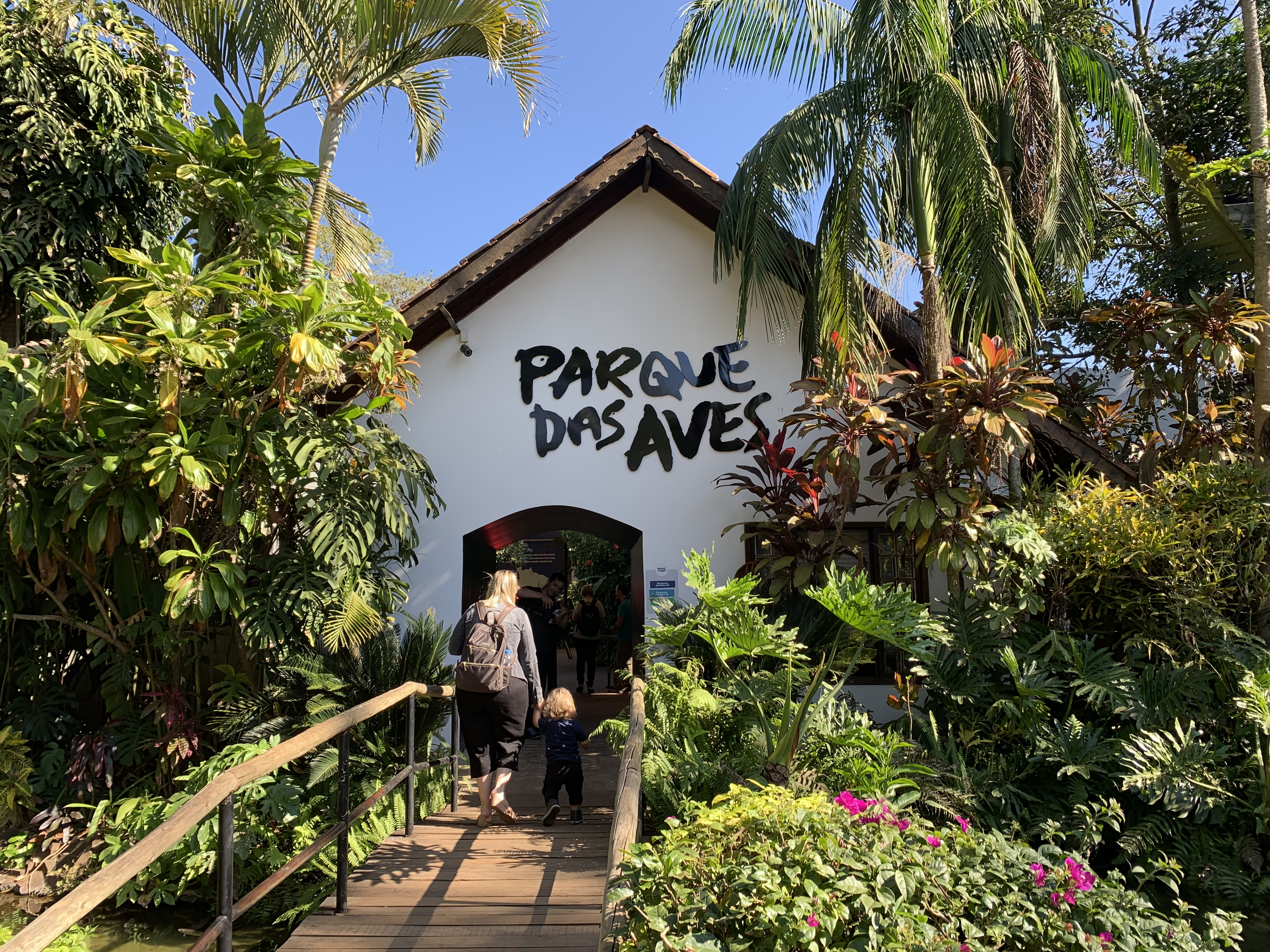
- Entrance, February 2011
- Interactive map of Parque das Aves
- Date opened: 1994
- Location: Foz do Iguaçu, Paraná State, Brazil
- Land area: 16 hectares (40 acres)
- Website: www.parquedasaves.com.br/v2/index.htm

The Parque das Aves (English: Bird Park) is a sanctuary and shelter for birds situated in Foz do Iguaçu, Paraná State, Brazil, and it is near to Iguaçu Falls. Its exhibits comprise mainly birds as well as other animals and butterflies.

The park was opened in 1994 and it is set within 16 hectares (40 acres) of forest.

== Gallery ==
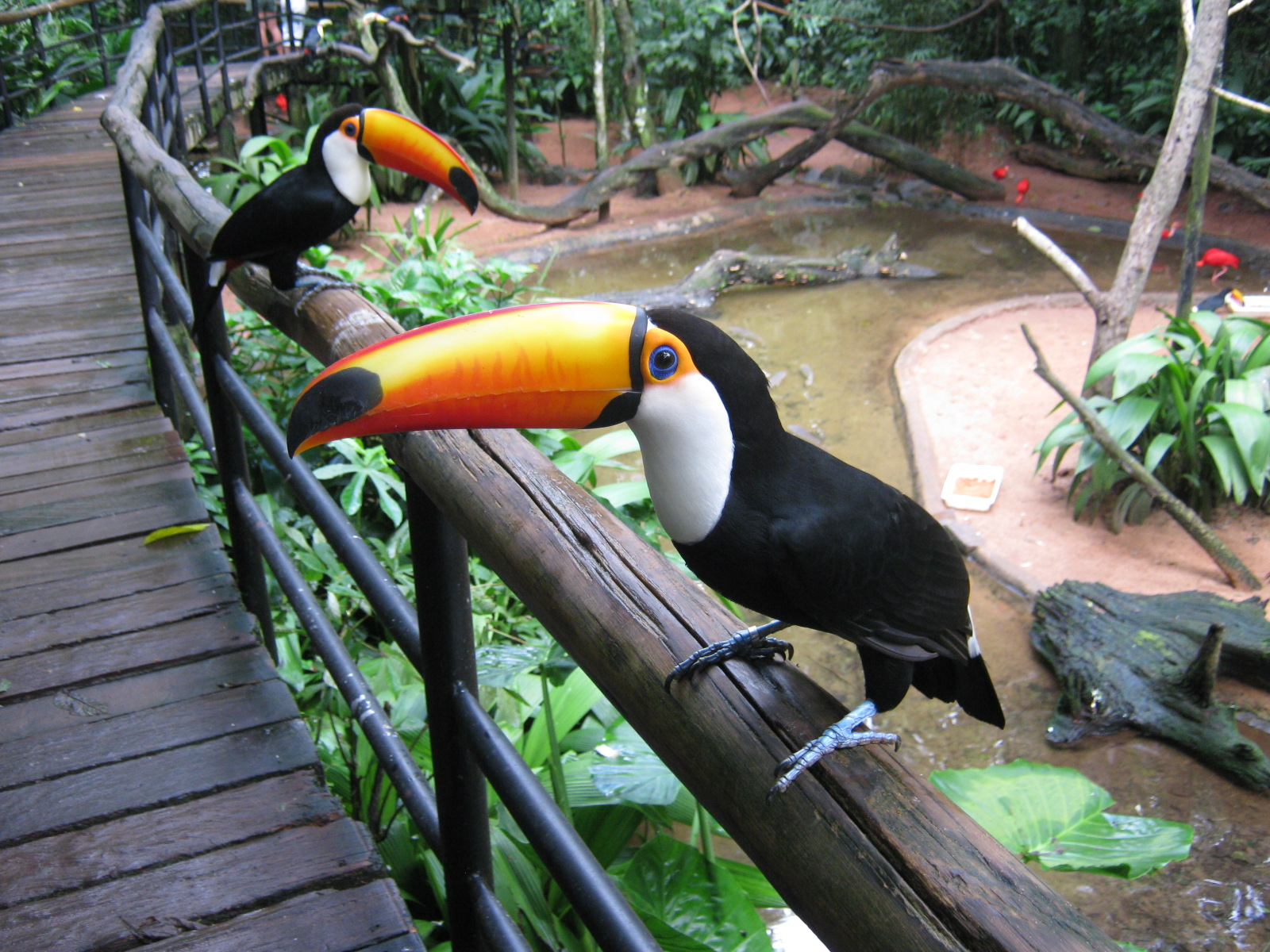
Two Toco toucans

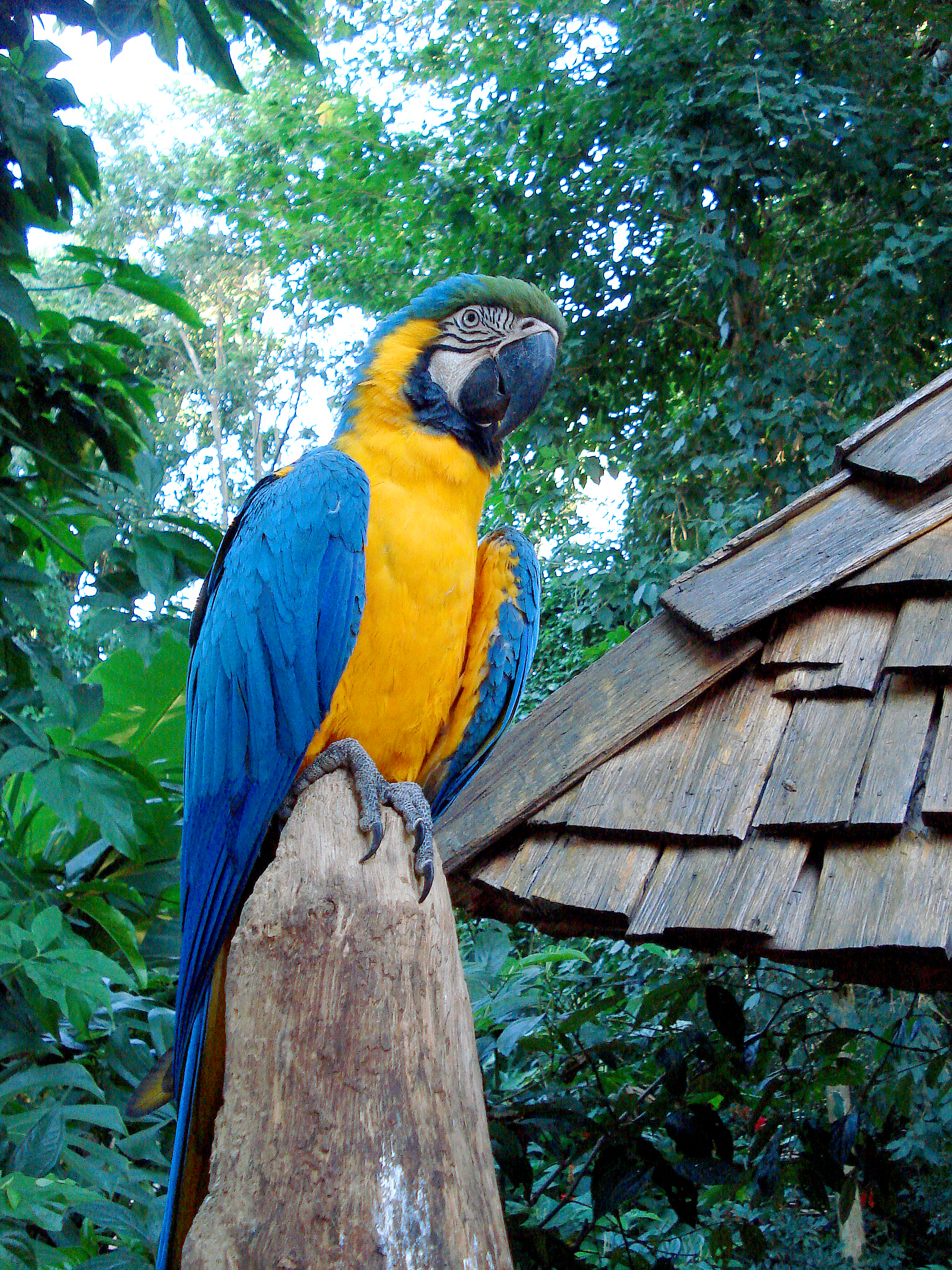
A Blue-and-yellow macaw

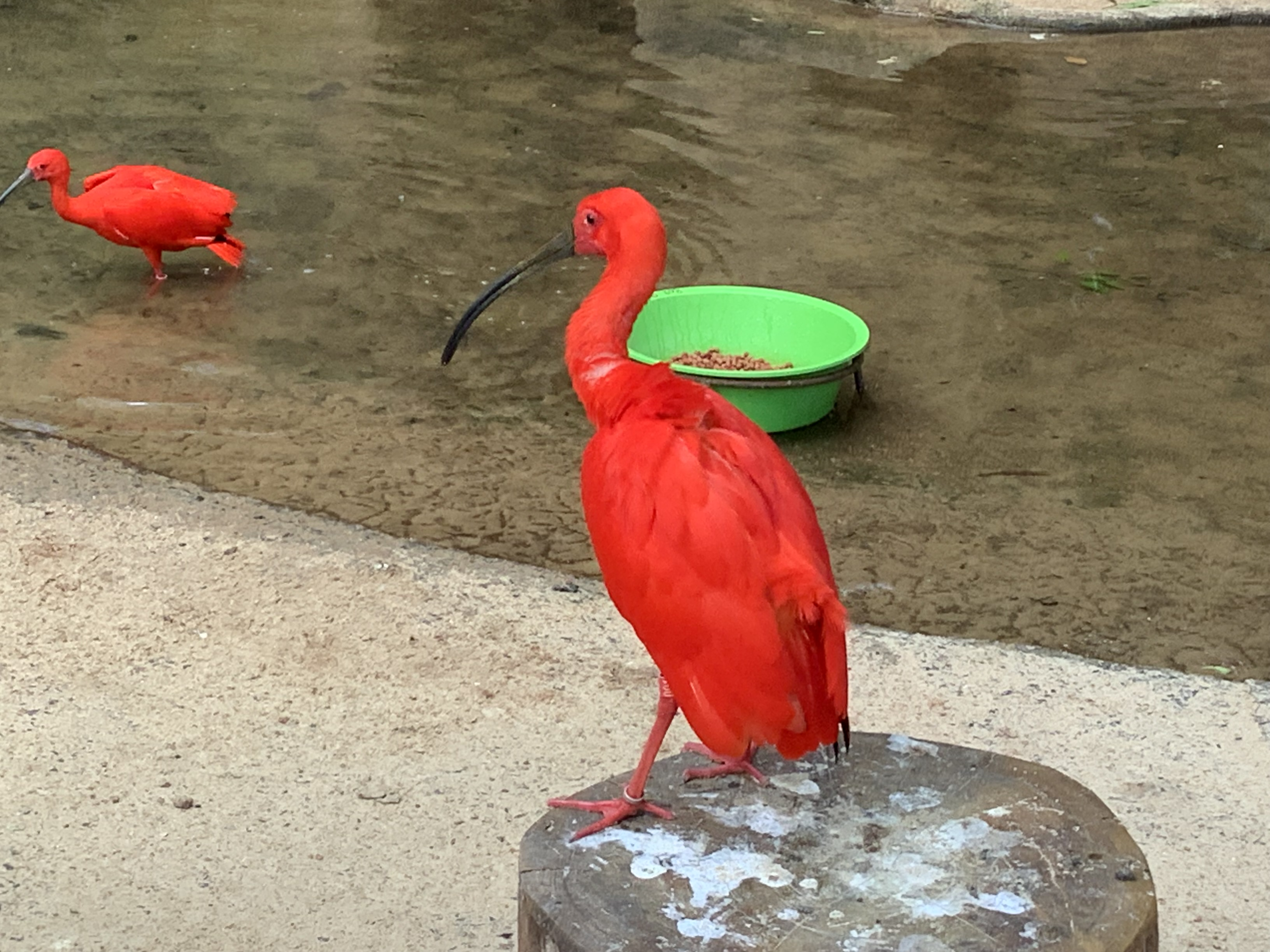
Scarlet Ibis at the entrance

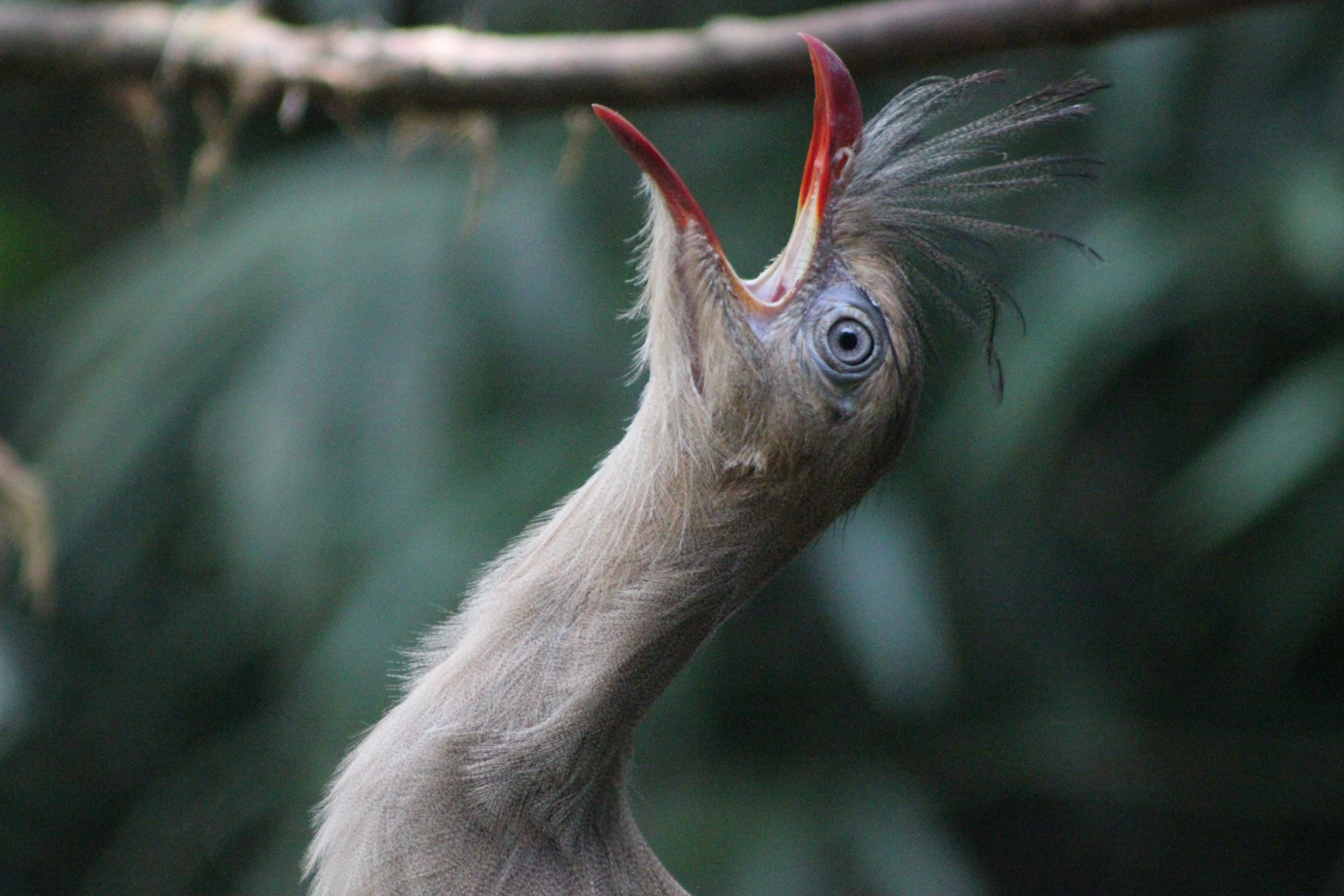
Screaming Cariama cristata.

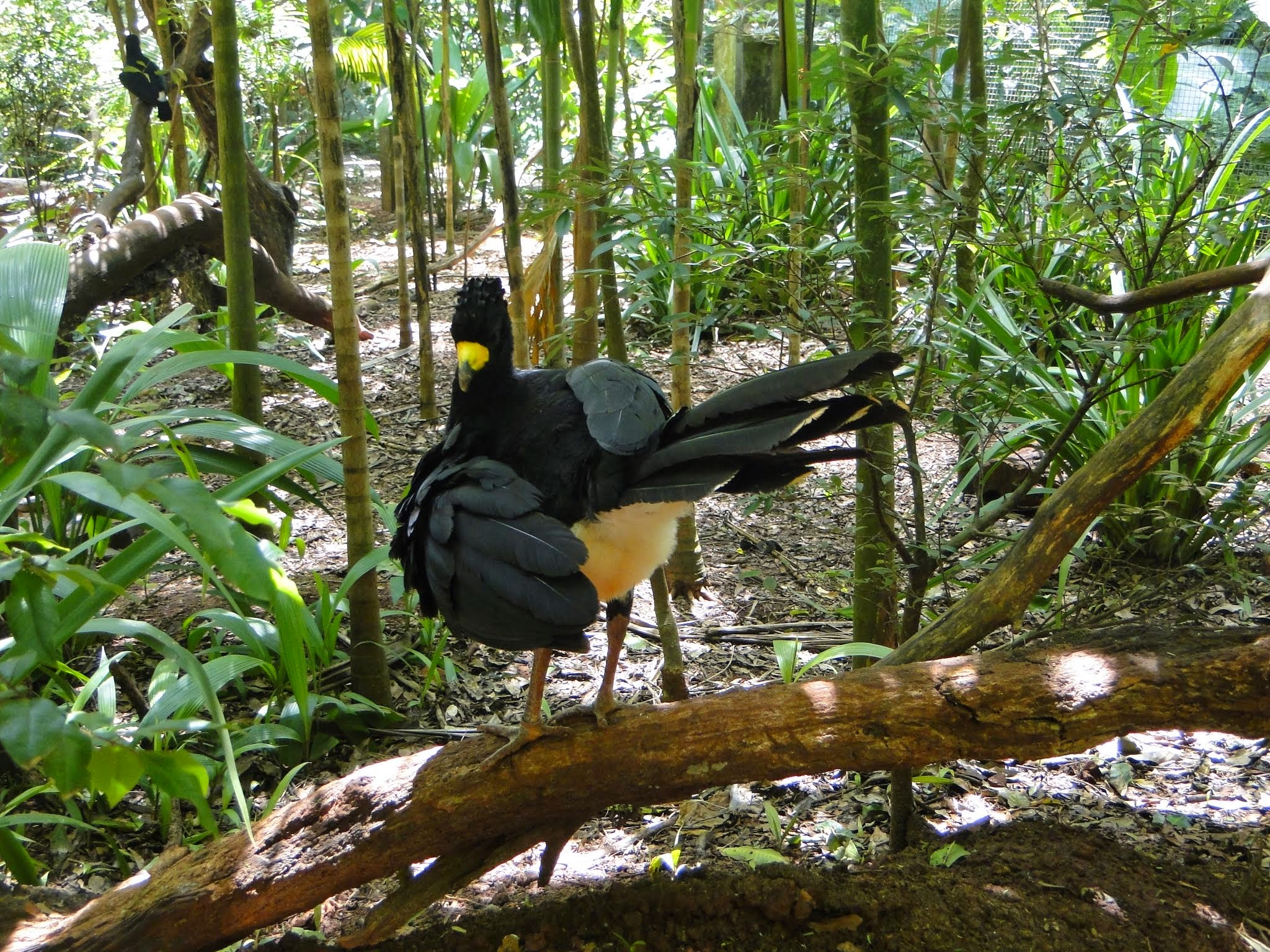
Male Bare-faced curassow

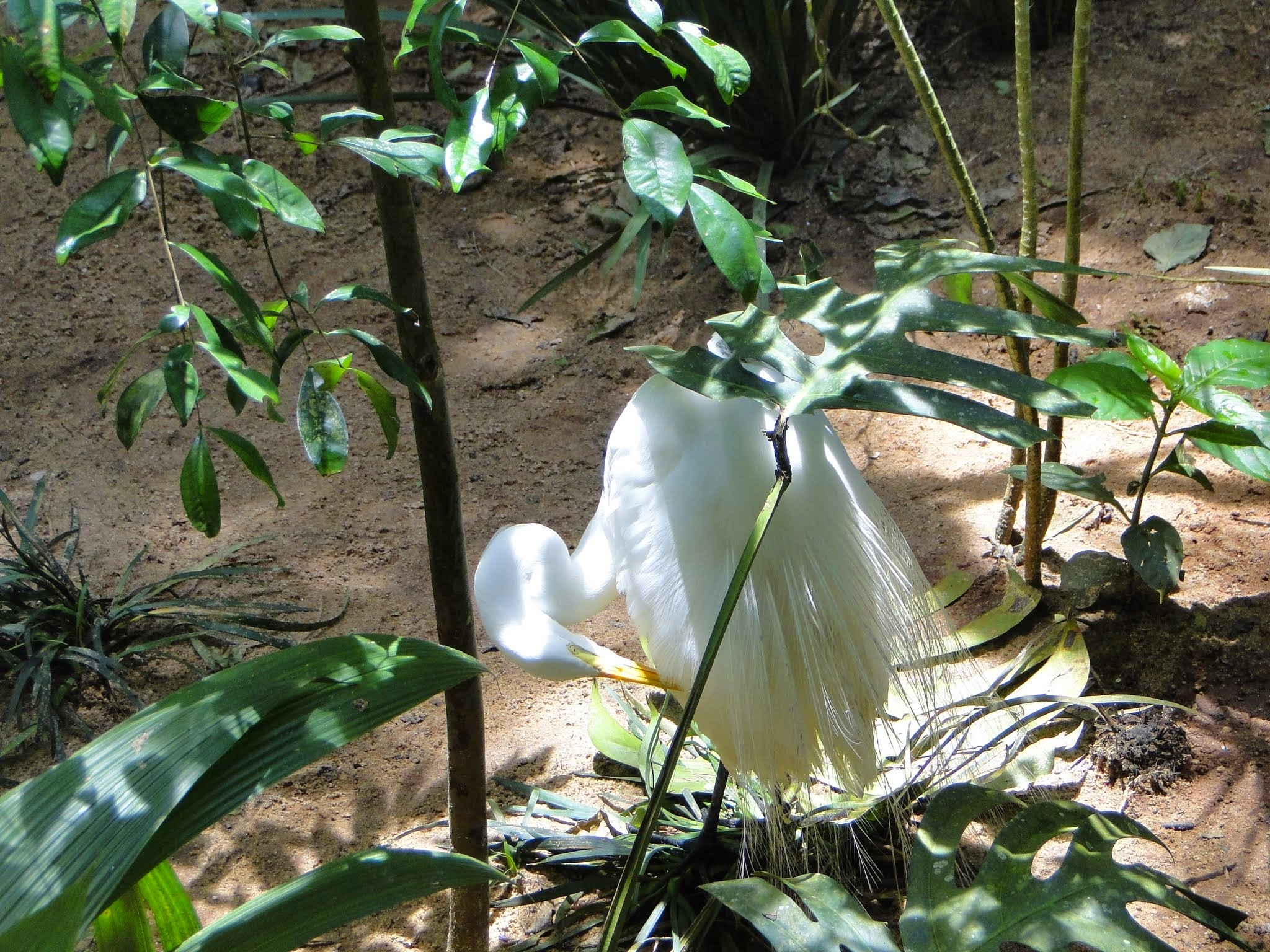
Great egret

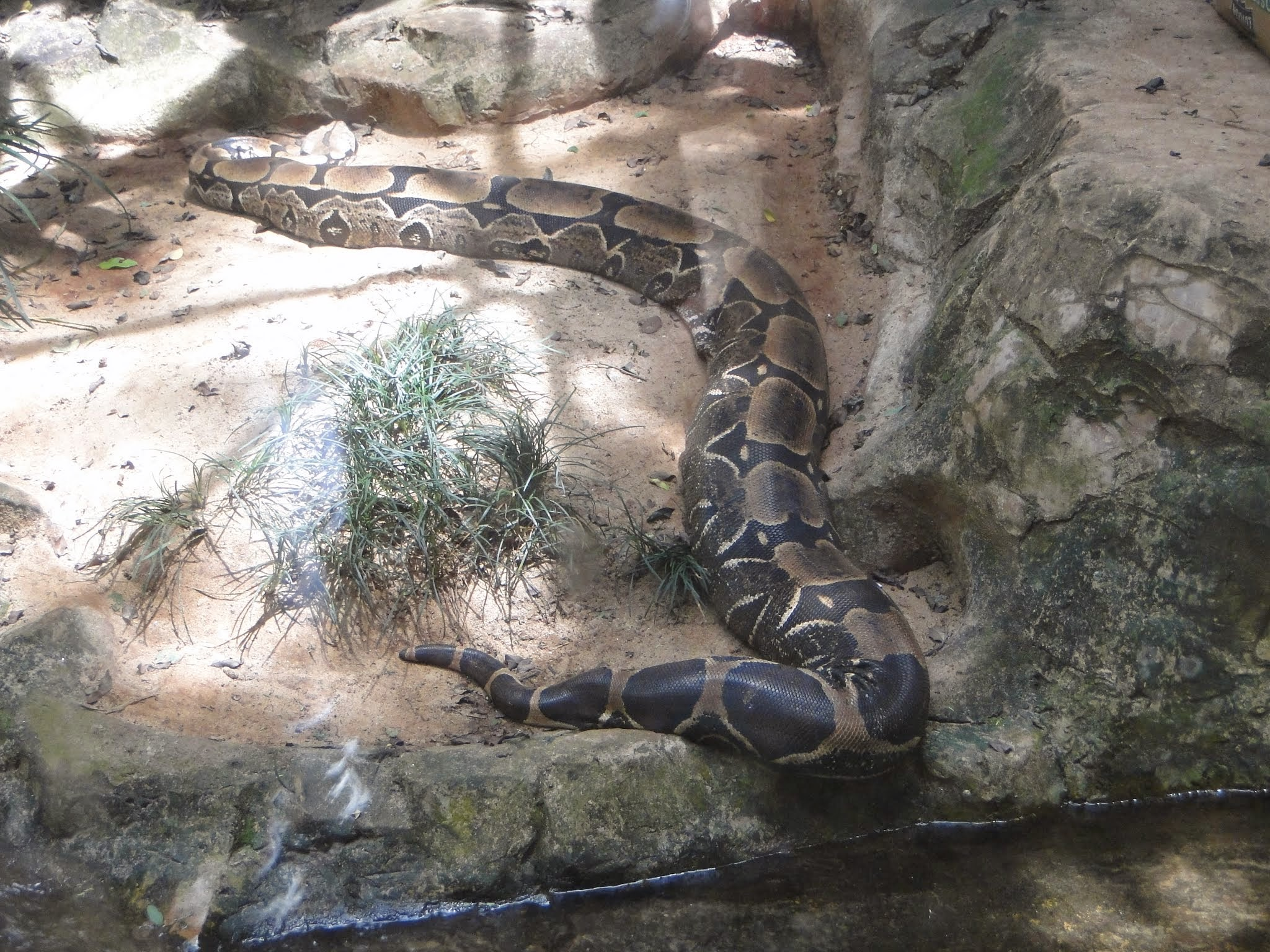
Common boa

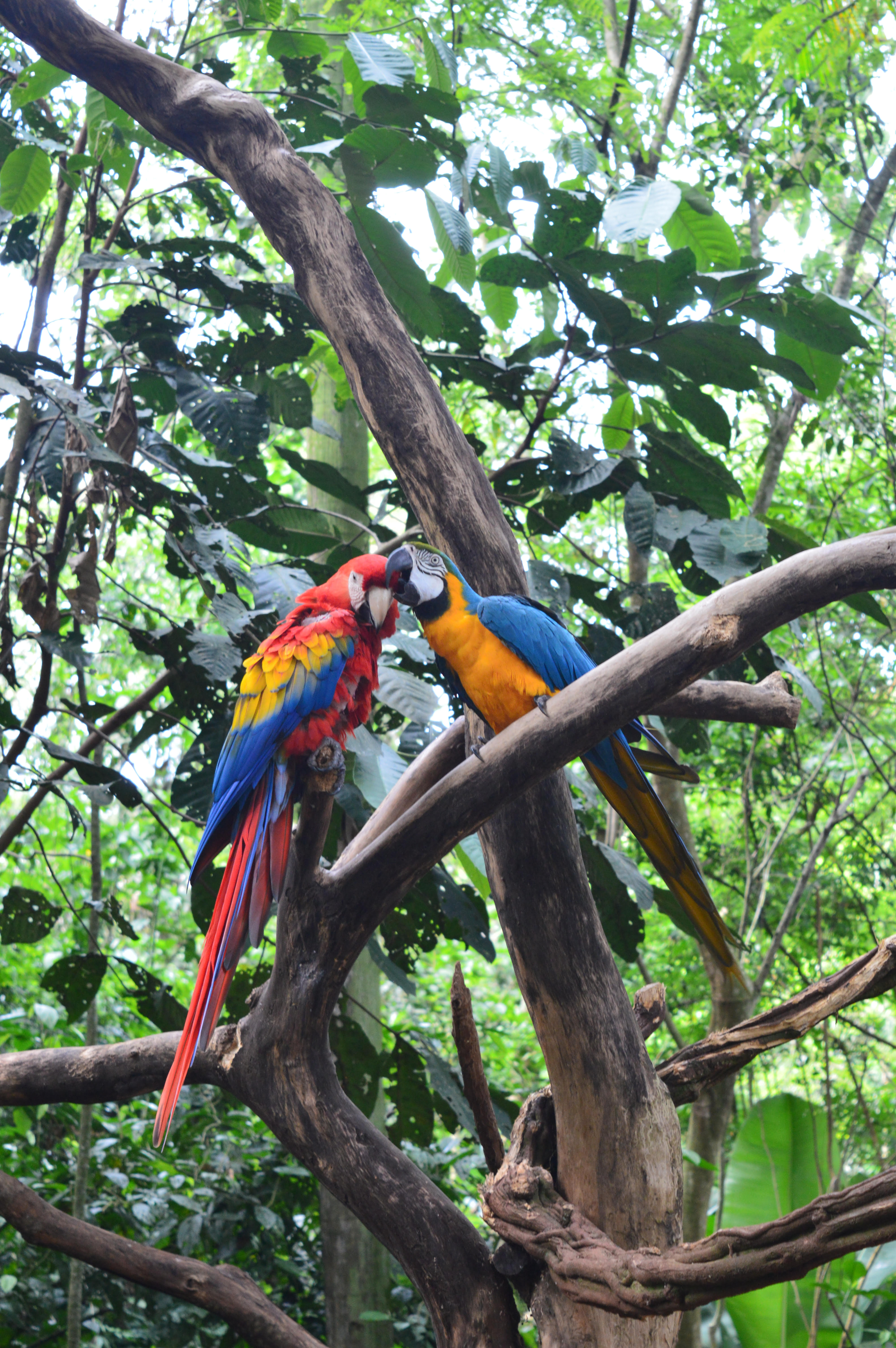
Scarlet and Blue-and-yellow Macaws

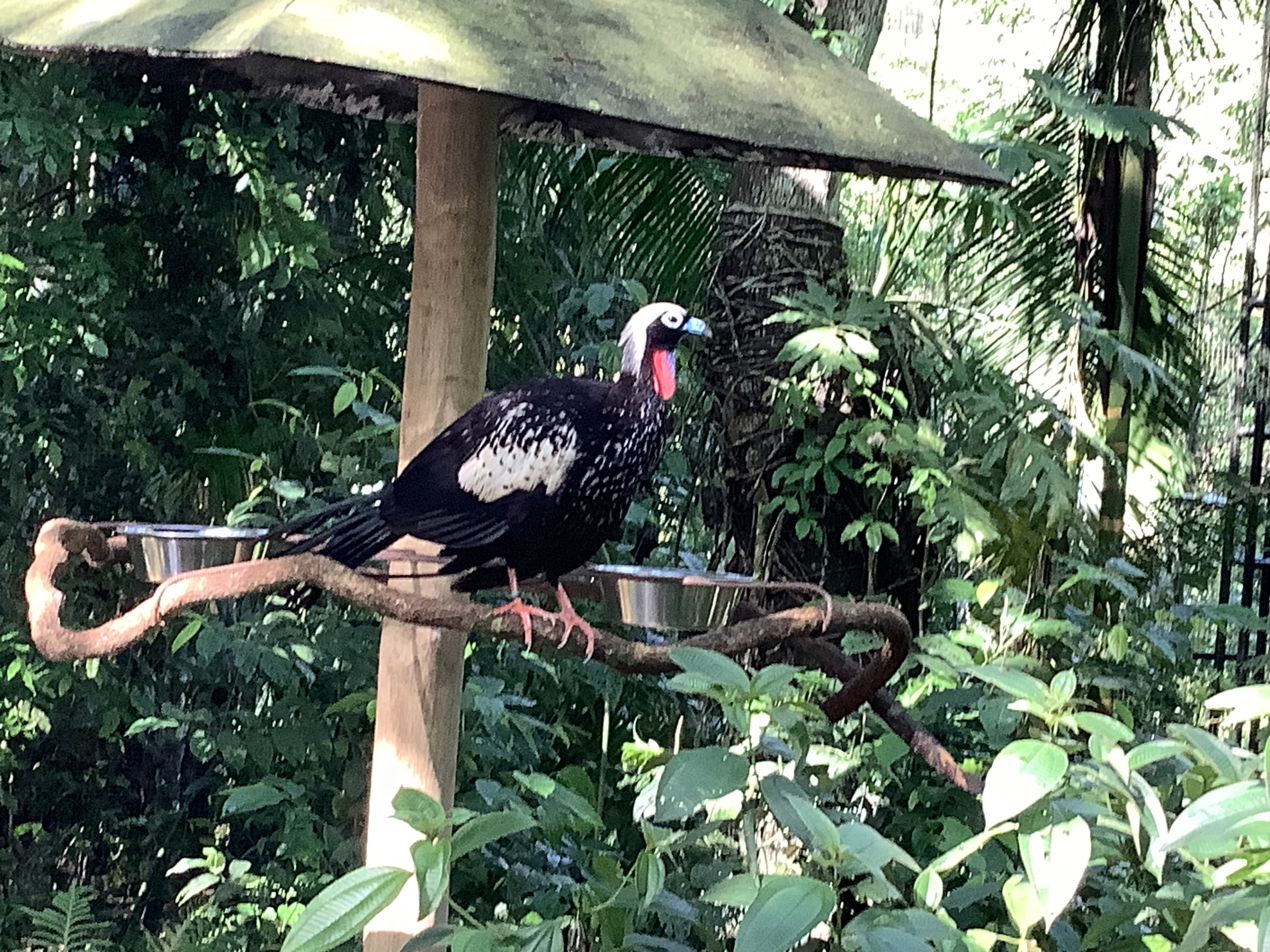
Black-fronted piping guan

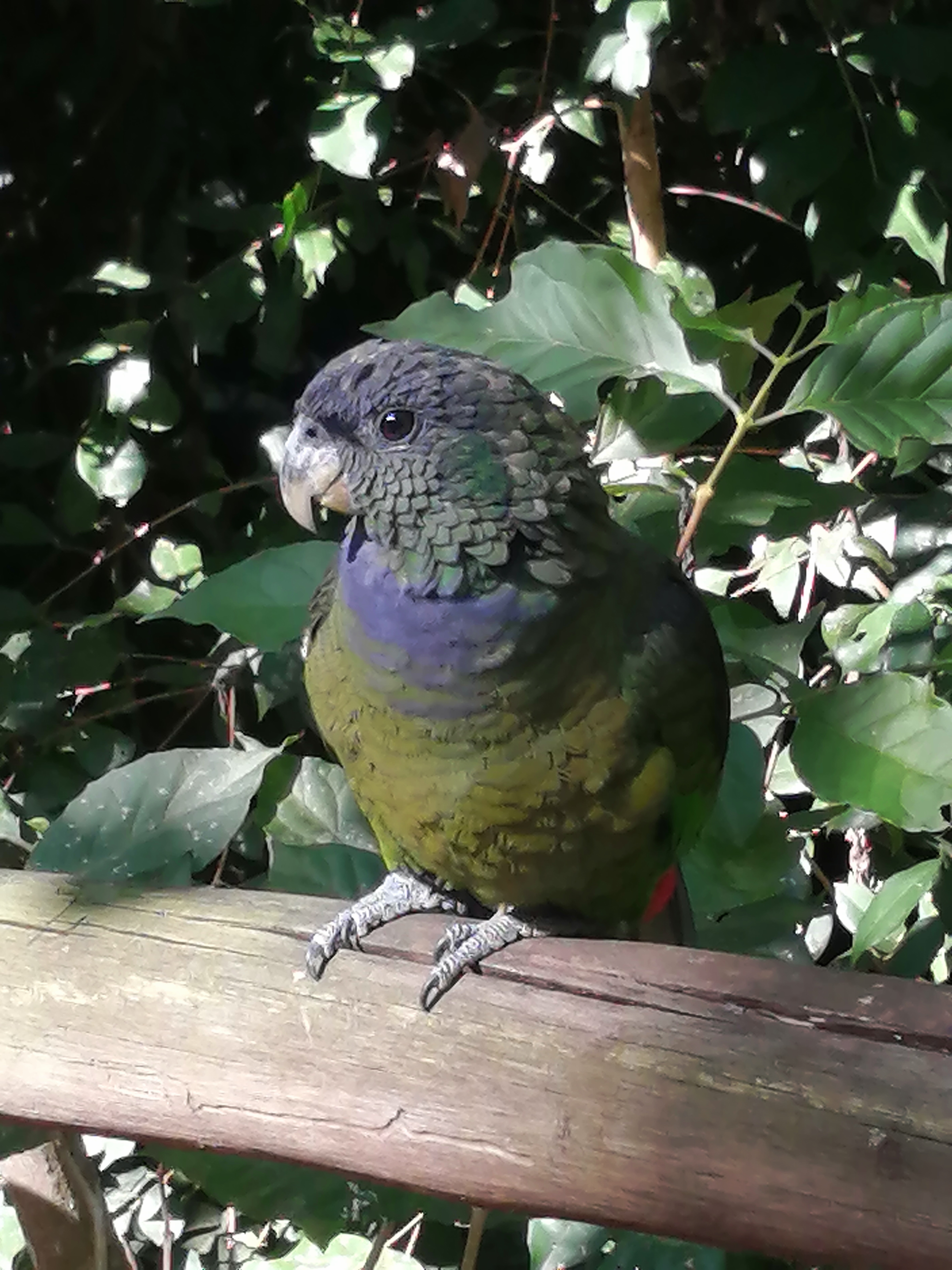
Scaly-headed parrot

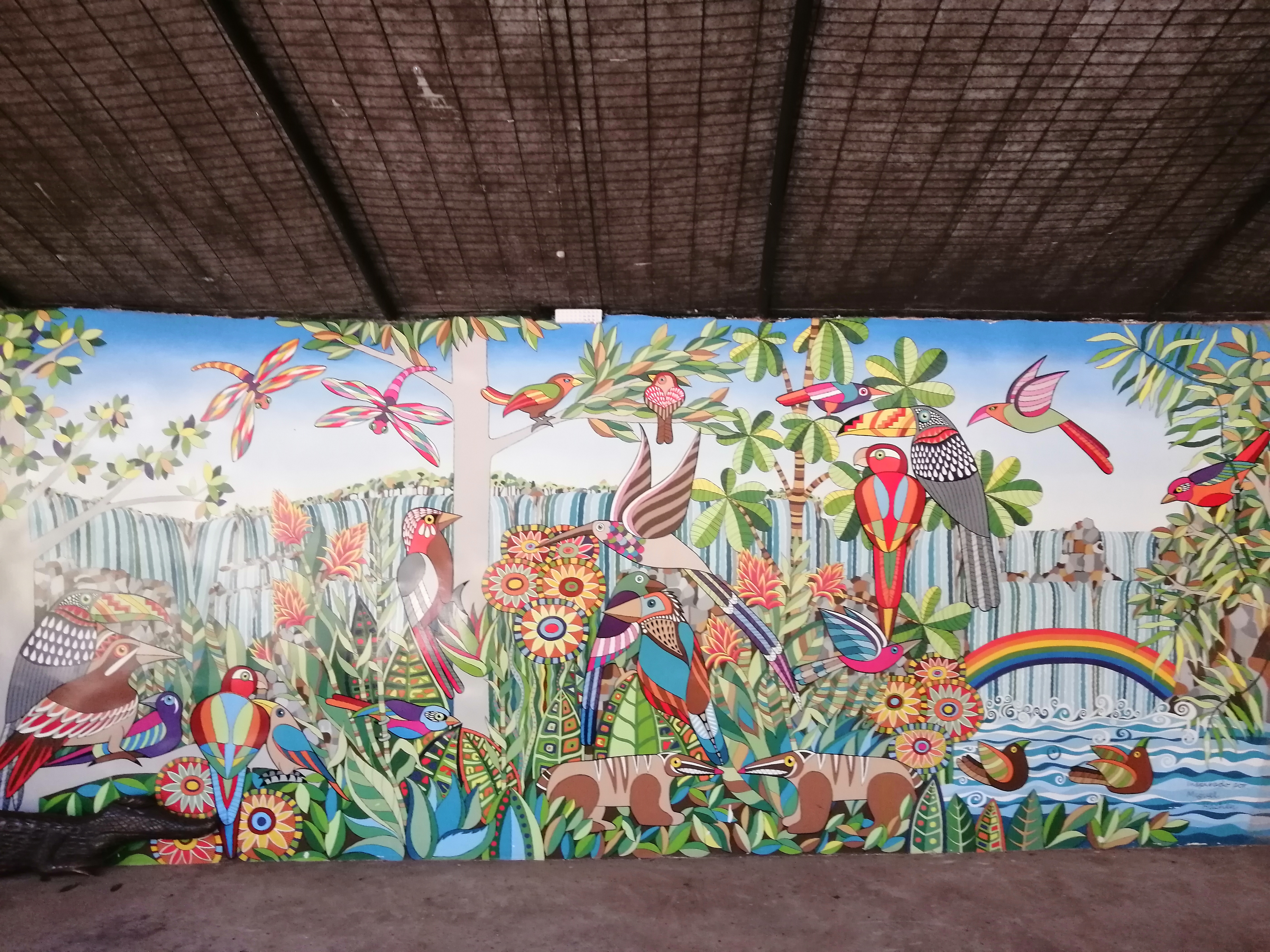
Mural painting from the park
