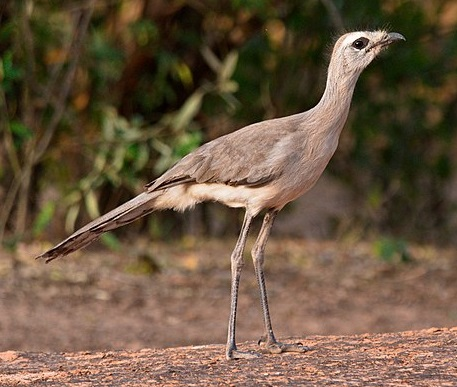

Scientific classification
- Kingdom: Animalia
- Phylum: Chordata
- Class: Aves
- Order: Cariamiformes
- Family: Cariamidae
- Genus: Chunga; Hartlaub, 1860

Type species
- Dicholophus burmeisteri Hartlaub, 1860

Species
- Chunga burmeisteri †Chunga incerta

= Chunga (bird) =

Chunga Temporal range: Miocene - Holocene, 16–0 Ma

Genus of birds in the seriema family

Chunga is one of two known genera of seriemas in the family Cariamidae. It is found in Argentina, Bolivia, and Paraguay. It contains one living species, the black-legged seriema. A prehistoric species, Chunga incerta, has been described from the Miocene and Pliocene Monte Hermoso Formation of Argentina.
