= Chunga incerta =

Chunga incerta Temporal range: Late Pliocene ~3 Ma

Scientific classification
- Domain: Eukaryota
- Kingdom: Animalia
- Phylum: Chordata
- Class: Aves
- Order: Cariamiformes
- Family: Cariamidae
- Genus: Chunga
- Species: †C. incerta

Binomial name
- †Chunga incerta Tonni, 1974

Extinct species of bird

Chunga incerta is an extinct species of cariamid bird which inhabited the Pliocene of the central-eastern Southern Cone of South America. It belongs to the genus Chunga, today only represented by one species, Chunga burmeisteri.

== History of discovery ==
This species was originally described in 1974 by Argentinian paleontologist Eduardo Pedro Tonni. The holotype is MLP 71-VII-5-1, the distal end of a tibiotarsus. MLP 71-VII-5-2 and MLP 71-VII-5-4 were also collected. These are fragmentary remains of tibiotarsus and tarsometatarsus. All of them were deposited in the collection of the museo de ciencias naturales of La Plata, which belongs to the Faculty of Natural Sciences and Museum of the Universidad Nacional de La Plata (UNLP). The type locality of C. incerta is the Monte Hermoso Formation, in the Partido de Monte Hermoso, Buenos Aires, Argentina. The postulated age for the bearing stratum is Late Pliocene, during the Montehermosan-Chapadmalalan South American land mammal ages, with an approximate age of 3 mya.

== Description ==
Since Chunga incerta is known from little more than a tibiotarsus, little can be inferred of its anatomy. Nevertheless, its mass has been estimated at 1.95 kg, similar to that of the present-day red-legged seriema.

== Distribution ==
The only living member of the genus Chunga, Chunga burmeisteri, inhabits dry environments, such as savannah, scrubland and dry forest. The presence of Chunga incerta in an area where the genus does not currently inhabit indicates that in the past it had a more southern and eastern austral distribution, probably accompanying different ecological conditions in that area, with warmer temperatures than those currently found in the area.
