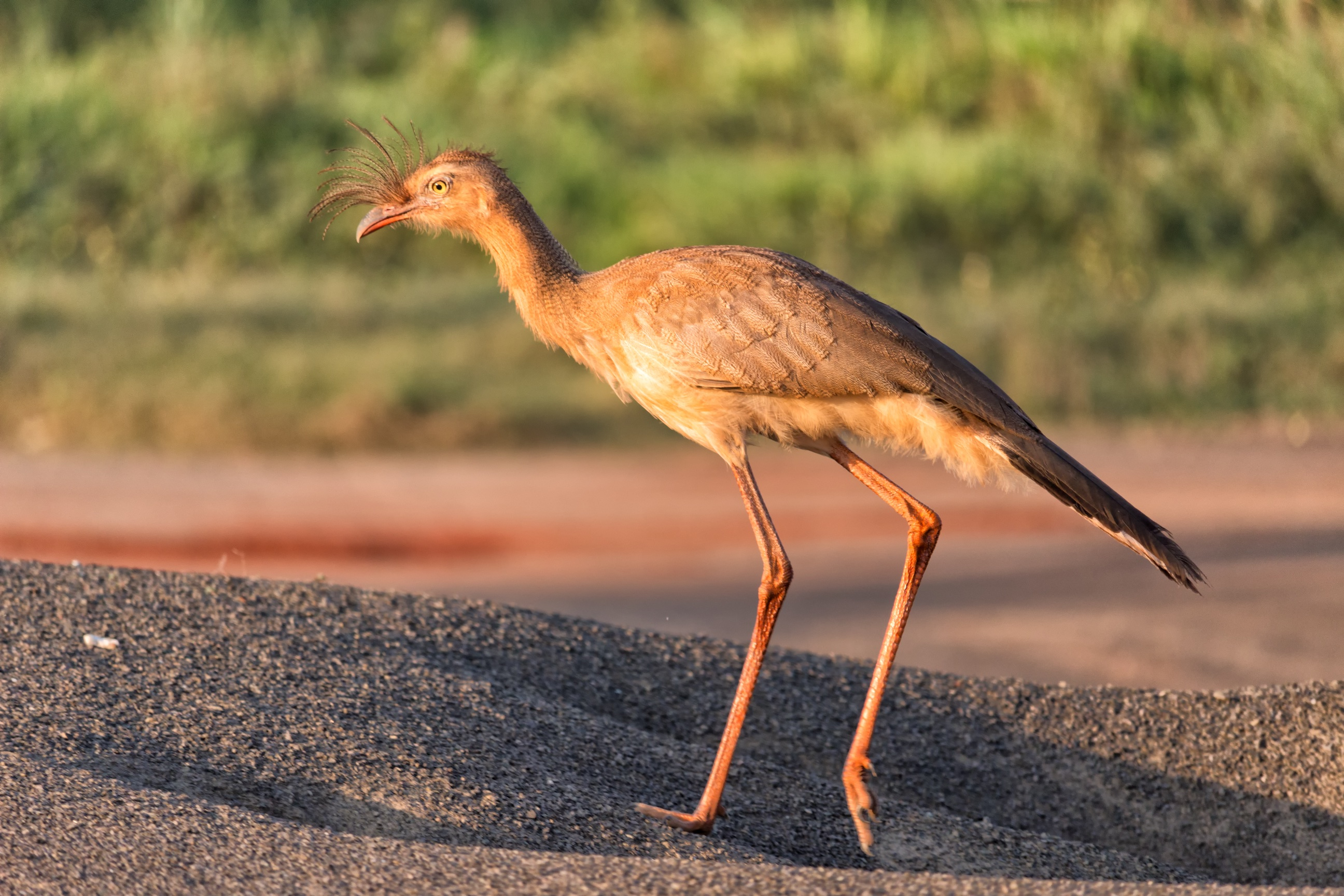
- Red-legged seriema (Cariama cristata)

Scientific classification
- Kingdom: Animalia
- Phylum: Chordata
- Class: Aves
- Order: Cariamiformes
- Superfamily: Cariamoidea; Bonaparte, 1853
- Family: Cariamidae; Bonaparte, 1853

Genera
- Cariama; Chunga †Miocariama
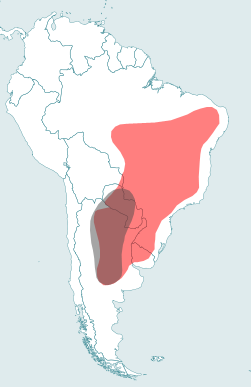
- Ranges of red-legged (red) and black-legged (black) seriemas

= Seriema =

Seriemas Temporal range: 16–0 Ma Middle Miocene – Holocene

Family of birds

The seriemas are the sole living members of the small bird family Cariamidae (the entire family is also referred to as "seriemas"), which is also the only surviving lineage of the order Cariamiformes. Once believed to be related to cranes, they have been placed near the falcons, parrots, and passerines, as well as the extinct Phorusrhacidae (terror birds). The seriemas are large, long-legged territorial birds that range from 70–90 cm (28–35 in) in length. They live in grasslands, savanna, dry woodland and open forests of Brazil, Bolivia, Argentina, Paraguay and Uruguay. There are two species of seriemas, the red-legged seriema (Cariama cristata) and the black-legged seriema (Chunga burmeisteri). Names for these birds in the Tupian languages are variously spelled as siriema, sariama, and çariama, and mean "crested".

== Description ==
Both species are around 90 cm (35 in) long (the red-legged seriema is slightly bigger than the black-legged, with 90 and 70–85 cm respectively). The seriemas forage on foot and run from danger rather than fly (though they can fly for short distances, and they roost in trees). They have long legs, necks, and tails, but only short wings, reflecting their way of life. Also, they are among the largest ground-dwelling birds endemic to the Neotropics (only behind rheas).

They are brownish birds with short bills and erectile crests, found in fairly dry open country, the red-legged seriema preferring grasslands and the black-legged seriema preferring scrub and open woodland. Also, they give loud, yelping calls and are often heard before they are seen. Furthermore, they have sharp claws, with an extensible and very curved second toe claw.

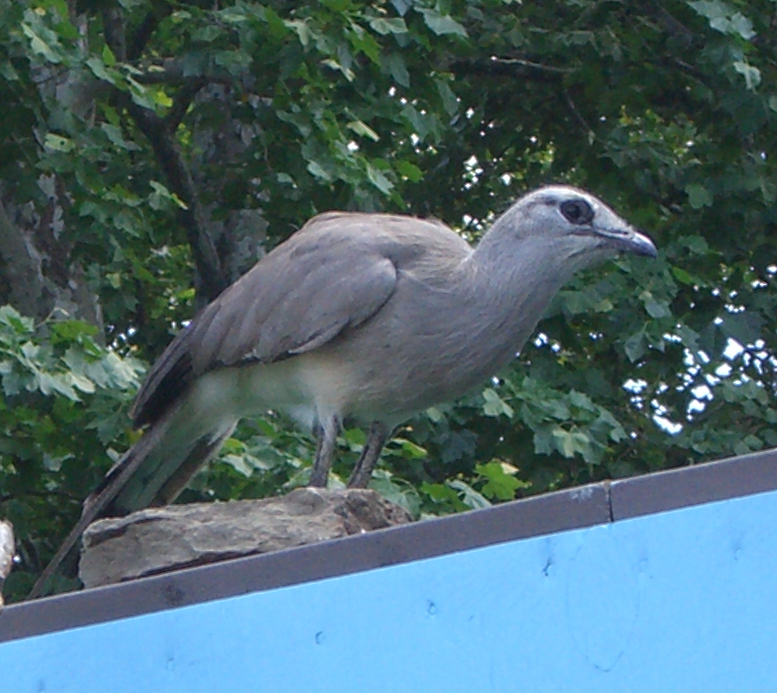
The black-legged seriema (Chunga burmeisteri) is smaller and has a more restricted distribution.

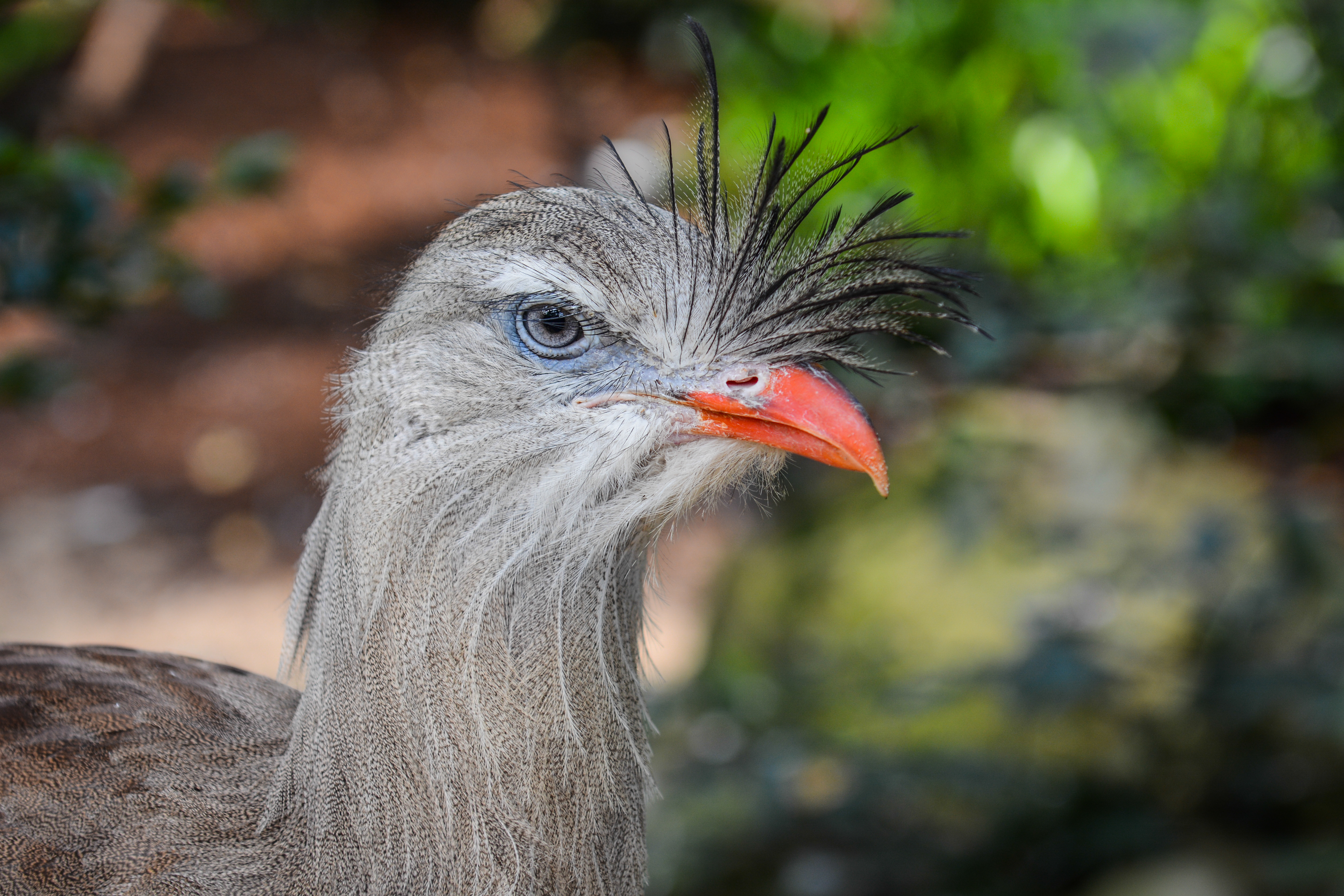
The frontal crest of the red-legged seriema (Cariama cristata) is unique among Neotropical birds.

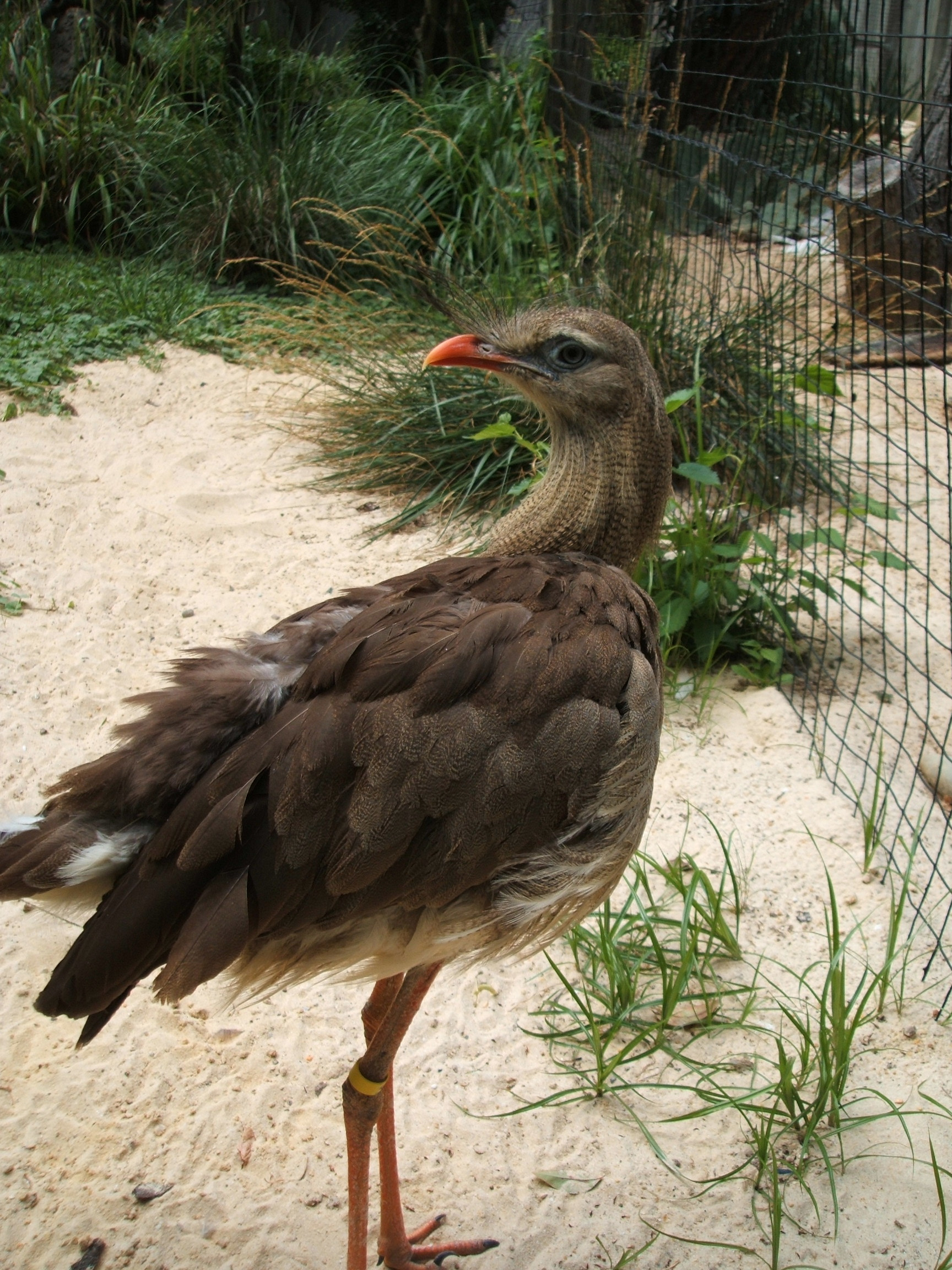
The seriemas have short wings and rarely take flight.

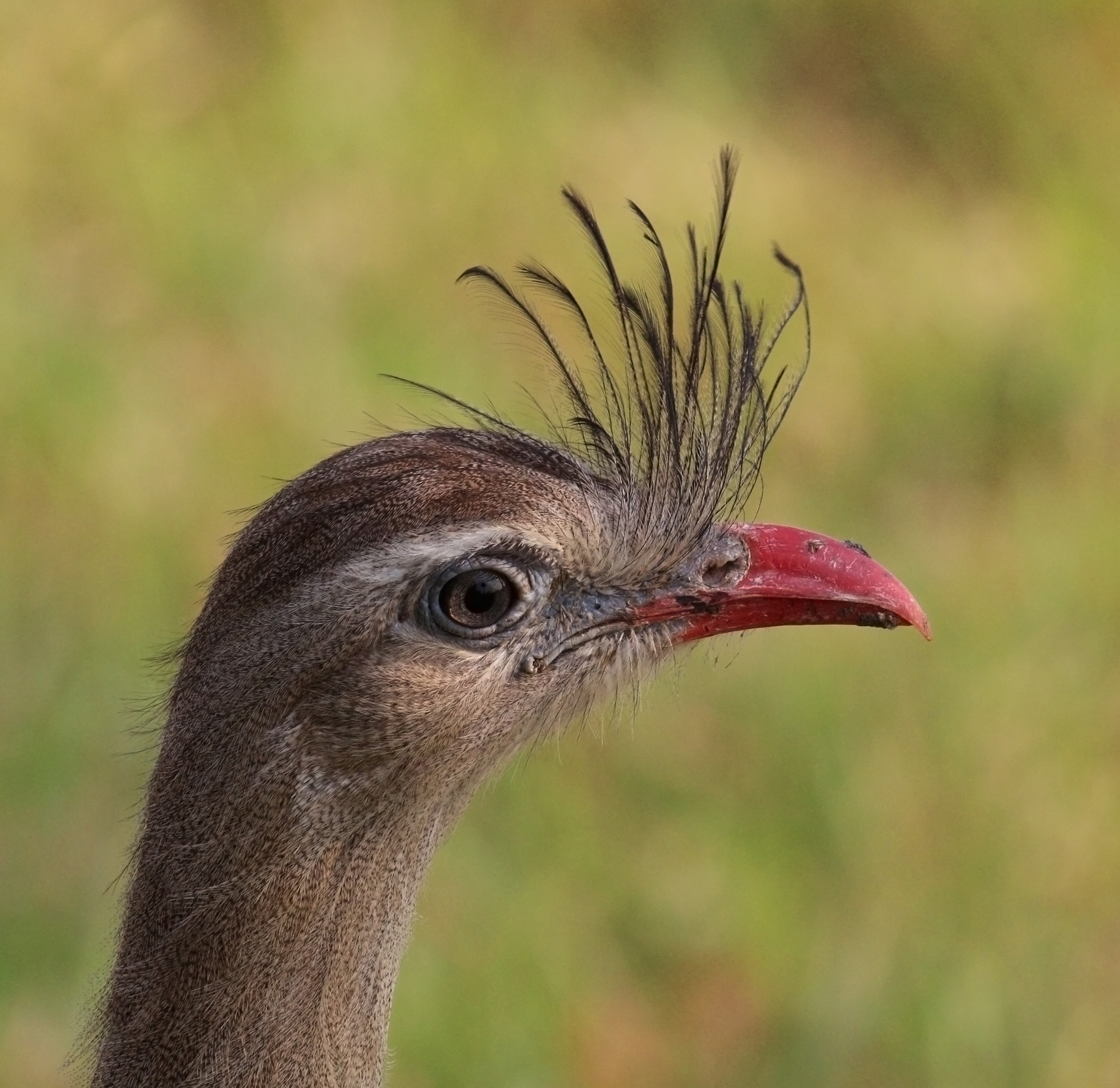
Cariama cristata
the Pantanal, Brazil

== Classification ==
Phylogenetic relationships of seriemas and terror birds

- - Cariamidae
    Red-legged seriema (Cariama cristata)
  - Black-legged seriema (Chunga burmeisteri)
- - Phorusrhacidae
    †Kelenken
  - †Phorusrhacos
  - †Paraphysornis

Cariamidae (seriemas) and Phorusrhacidae (terror birds) are closely related groups within Cariamiformes. Their exact phylogenetic relationship and the internal relationships of Phorusrhacidae vary among analyses.

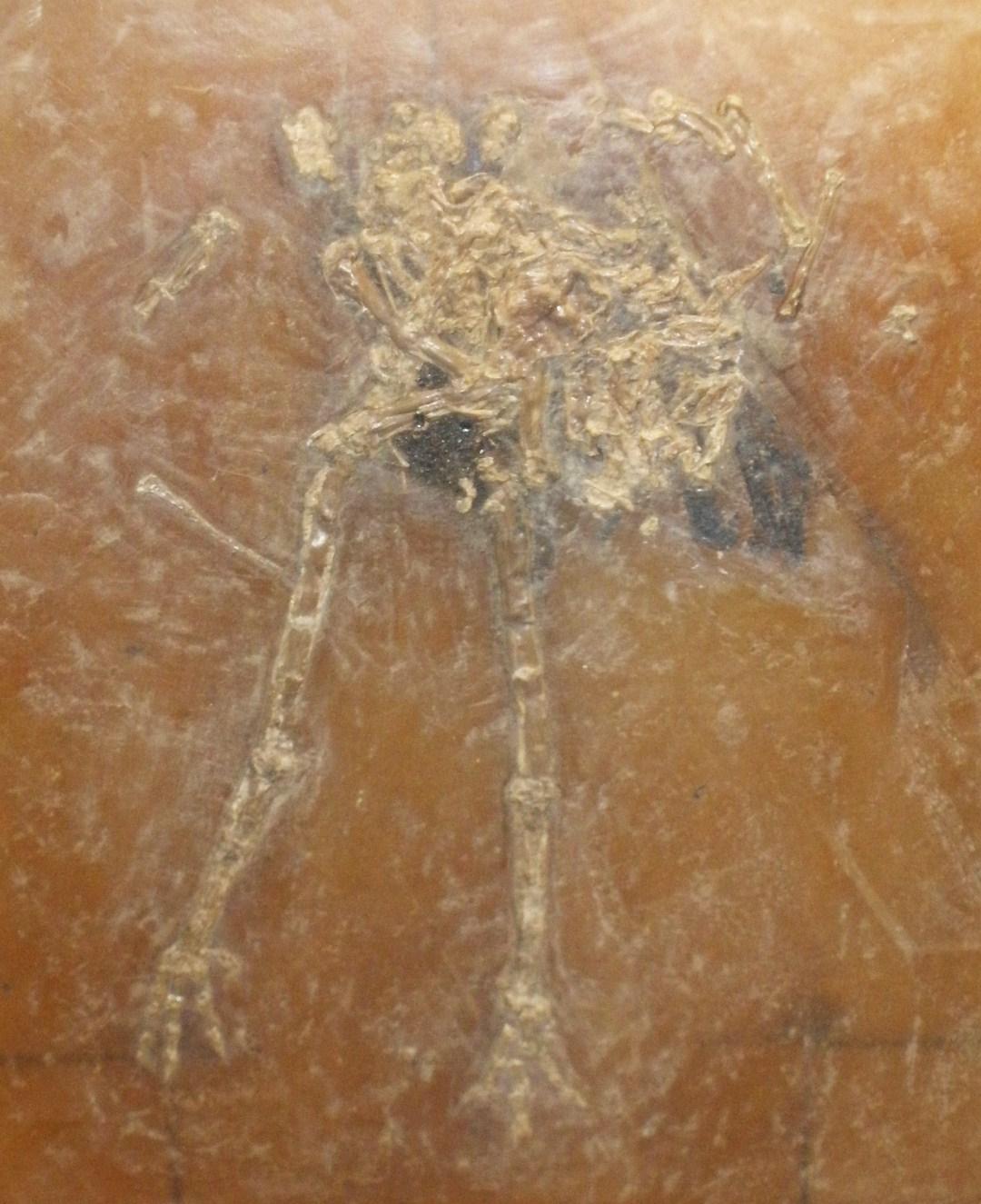
Idiornis tuberculata fossil

These birds are thought to be the closest living relatives of a group of gigantic (up to 10 ft or 3.0 m tall) carnivorous "terror birds", the phorusrhacids, which are known from fossils from South and North America. Several other related groups, such as the idiornithids and bathornithids were part of Palaeogene faunas in North America and Europe and possibly elsewhere too. However, the fossil record of the seriemas themselves is poor, with two prehistoric species, Chunga incerta and Miocariama patagonica (formerly Noriegavis santacrucensis), both from the Miocene of Argentina, having been described to date. Some of the fossils from the Eocene fauna of the Messel pit (i.e. Salimia and Idiornis) have also been suggested to be seriemas, as has the massive predatory Paracrax from the Oligocene of North America, though their status remains uncertain.

=== Extant species ===
There are two living species of seriema.

Image	Genus	Species	Description	Distribution
	Cariama Brisson, 1760	red-legged seriema, or crested cariama (Cariama cristata)	It is bigger and nests on the ground or in bushes or trees up to 3 m (9.8 ft) above the ground.	Eastern Brazil, to central Argentina
	Chunga Hartlaub, 1860	black-legged seriema (Chunga burmeisteri)	It nests in trees.	Northwest Argentina and Paraguay

== Behaviour and ecology ==
Ecologically, the seriema is the South American counterpart of the African secretary bird. They feed on insects, snakes, lizards, frogs, young birds, and rodents, with small amounts of plant food (including maize and beans). They often associate with grazing livestock, probably to take insects the animals disturb. When seriemas catch small reptiles, they beat the prey on the ground or throw it at a hard surface to break resistance and also the bones.

Because of these feeding behaviors, seriemas are important by eating detritivores and helping the soil get more nutrients from dead plant matter.

In contact with humans, seriemas are suspicious and if they feel threatened, usually spread their wings and face the threat. They walk in pairs or small groups. Although perfectly capable of flying, they prefer to spend most of their time on land. They take flight only when necessary, for example to escape a predator. Overnight they take shelter in the treetops, where they also build their nests.

=== Breeding ===
The breeding biology of the seriemas is poorly known, and much of what is known comes only from red-legged seriemas. Pairs appear to be territorial and avoid others of their species while breeding, and fights between rivals have been observed. These fights involving kicking rivals, can go on for long periods of time, and involve much calling by the involved birds.

Seriemas build a large bulky stick nest, lined with leaves and dung, which is placed in a tree 1–5 m (3.3–16.4 ft) off the ground. The placement of the nest is so that the adults can reach the nest by foot rather than flying, through hops and the occasional flutter. Both sexes are involved in building the nest. They lay two or three white or buff eggs sparsely spotted with brown and purple. The female does most of the incubation, which lasts from 24 to 30 days. Hatchlings are downy but stay in the nest for about two weeks; after which they leave the nest and follow both parents. They reach full maturity at the age of four to five months. It is unknown when fledgling chicks reach sexual maturity.
