= Dendrocopos praemedius =

Dendrocopos praemedius Temporal range: Piacenzian

Scientific classification
- Kingdom: Animalia
- Phylum: Chordata
- Class: Aves
- Order: Piciformes
- Family: Picidae
- Genus: Dendrocopos
- Species: †D. praemedius

Binomial name
- †Dendrocopos praemedius Jánossy, 1974

Extinct species of bird

Dendrocopos praemedius is an extinct species of Dendrocopos that lived during the Piacenzian stage of the Pliocene epoch.

== Distribution ==
Dendrocopos praemedius fossils are known from Austria.
