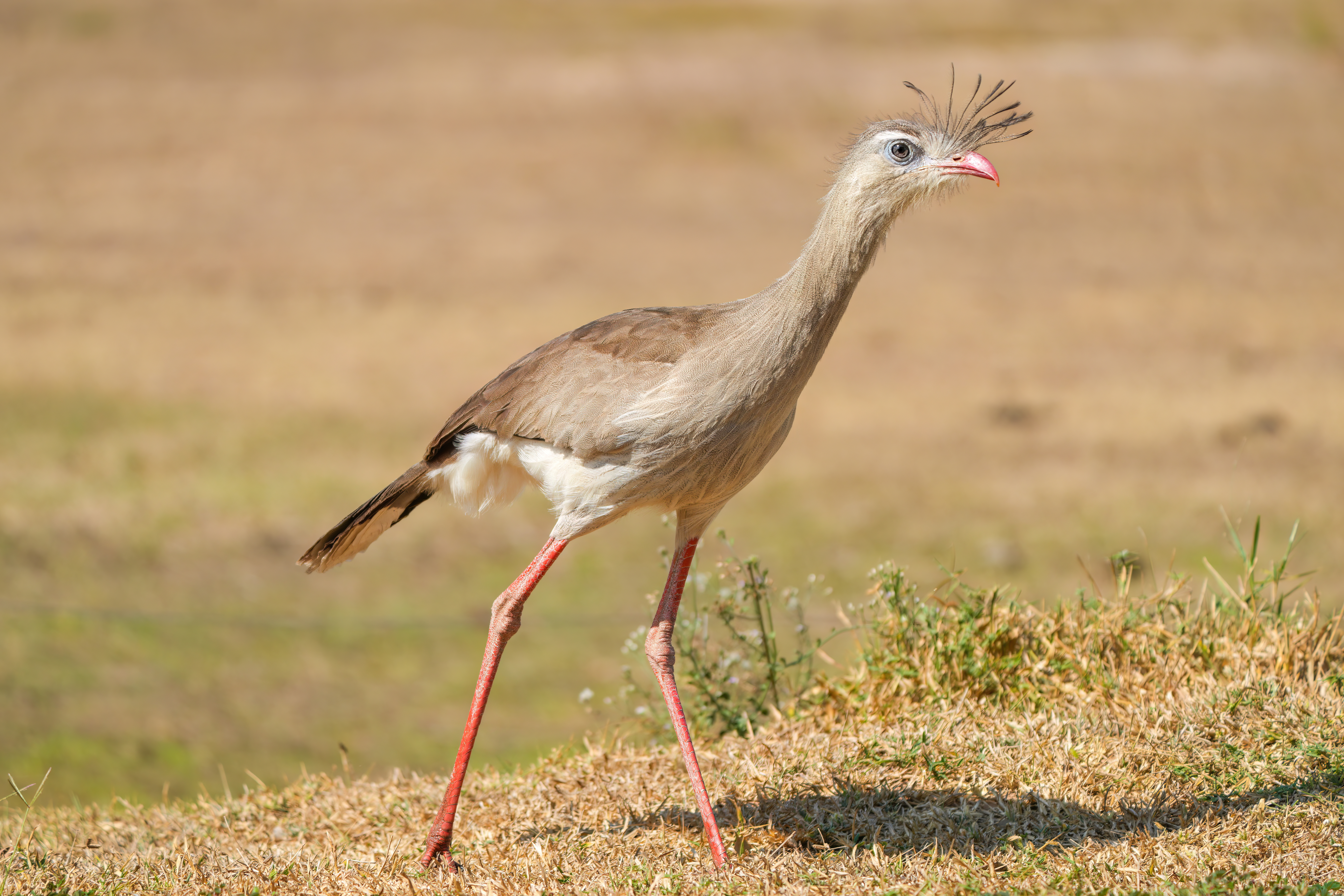
- in Mato Grosso, Brazil

Conservation status
- Least Concern (IUCN 3.1)

Scientific classification
- Kingdom: Animalia
- Phylum: Chordata
- Class: Aves
- Order: Cariamiformes
- Family: Cariamidae
- Genus: Cariama; Brisson, 1760
- Species: C. cristata

Binomial name
- Cariama cristata (Linnaeus, 1766)

Synonyms
- (Genus): Microdactylus É.Geoffroy Saint-Hilaire, 1809; (Species): Microdactylus marcgravii É.Geoffroy Saint-Hilaire, 1809; Palamedea cristata Linnaeus, 1766

= Red-legged seriema =

Species of bird

The red-legged seriema /sɛriˈiːmə/ (Cariama cristata), also known as the crested cariama /kæriˈɑːmə/ and crested seriema, is a mostly predatory terrestrial bird in the seriema family (Cariamidae), included in the Gruiformes in the old polyphyletic circumscription but recently placed in a distinct order: Cariamiformes (along with three extinct families).

The red-legged seriema is widely distributed in South America, occurring in central and eastern Brazil through eastern Bolivia and Paraguay to Uruguay and central Argentina (south to La Pampa).

Like the black-legged seriema, farmers often use them as guard animals to protect poultry from predators and sometimes human intruders.

== Taxonomy ==
The red-legged seriema was described in 1766 by the Swedish naturalist Carl Linnaeus in the twelfth edition of his Systema Naturae. He coined the binomial name Palamedea cristata. The red-legged seriema is now the only species placed in the genus Cariama that was introduced by the French zoologist Mathurin Jacques Brisson in 1760. The specific epithet cristata is Latin for "crested", "plumed" or "tufted". The German naturalist Georg Marcgrave used the Latin word Cariama for the red-legged seriema in his Historia naturalis Brasiliae, which was published in 1648.

The name is derived from the Portuguese word seriema, which comes from a Tupi word corresponding to çariama, derived from the words çaria (crest) and am (raised).

== Description ==
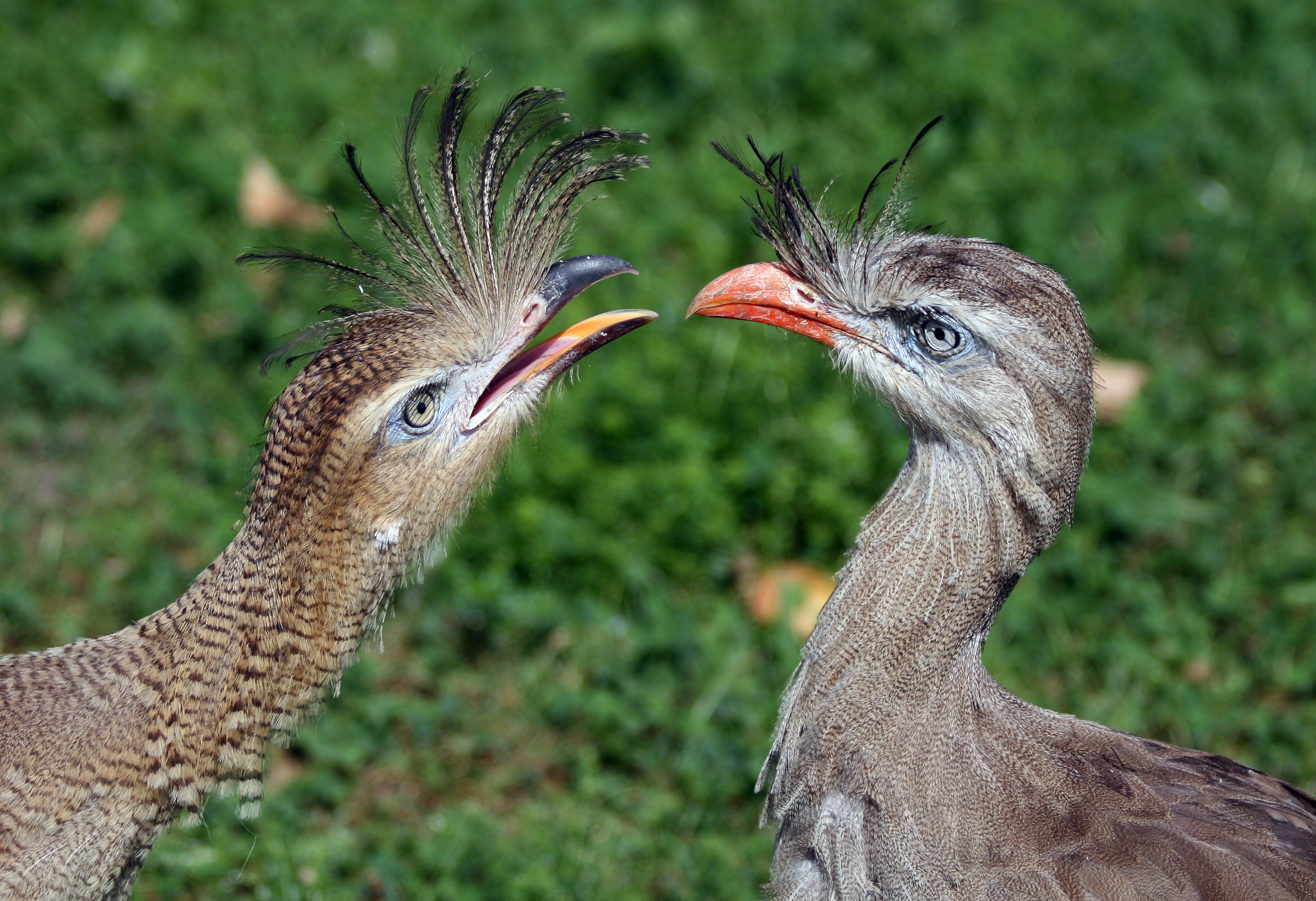
Close-up of Cariama cristata

The red-legged seriema is around 75 to 90 centimetres (30 to 35 in) long and weighs about 1.5 to 2.2 kilograms (3.3 to 4.9 lb), with long legs, necks, and tails. The males are slightly larger than females. It has a greyish-brown plumage, finely barred and vermiculated with dark brown and black; pale brown on the head, neck, and breast; white on belly. The long, broad outer tail has a subterminal black band and a white tip. It has a reddish beak and very long, salmon-coloured legs. The eyes are yellow. Soft feathers emerge from the base of the bill to form a distinctive fan-shaped crest.

Many other characteristics are shared with the black-legged seriema (Chunga burmeisteri), the only other living member of its family. Some of these traits are discussed in the Cariamidae article.

== Distribution and habitat ==
The red-legged seriema inhabits most of central and eastern Brazil, Paraguay, eastern and southeastern Bolivia, Uruguay, and northeastern Argentina. It is found at elevations up to 6,600 feet (2,000 m).

The red-legged seriema prefers grassland habitat to any other. Though it likes to inhabit lush meadows near rivers, it will not readily move into wetlands or crop fields. It frequents semi-open and fairly dry areas such as thorny scrub and semi-arid woodland regions, savannas and ranchlands, and also hilly grasslands near wooded areas. This species is very typical in Caatinga, Cerrado and Chaco.

== Behaviour and ecology ==
Seriemas are wary, territorial, and diurnal birds. Generally, the red-legged seriema is sedentary, although there are reports of temperature-related migrations. It is typically seen singly or in pairs, but occasionally in groups of up to four individuals, apparently families. It usually walks on the ground and can easily run faster than a human in its habitat. It will flee a car on foot at speeds up to 25 km/h (16 mph) before flying.

Territorial defence may involve agonistic confrontation between individuals, initially characterised by full vocal duets followed by short runs and flights towards intruders, alternated with claws and beak attacks. In one conflict between two birds, they jumped at each other feet-first, keeping their balance by flapping.

This species typically nests on low trees or bushes, so that adults are able to reach the nest from the ground by short hops or flutters, rather than by flying.

Red-legged seriemas demonstrate an unusual way of hunting vertebrate prey; they pick the prey up with their beak and repeatedly throw it at the ground until it is stunned or dead.

== Voice ==
Full vocal activity is mainly done at dawn and to a lesser extent, at dusk. It can also occur irregularly at other times of day.

The song has a quality described as "a cross between 'the serrated bark of a young dog and the clucking of turkeys'". At the loudest part of the song, the bird has its neck bent so its head is touching its back. Both members of a pair as well as young down to the age of two weeks sing; often one member of a family starts a song just as another finishes, or two sing simultaneously. The song can be heard several kilometres away; in Emas National Park, Brazil, in 1981–1982, observers often heard four red-legged seriemas or groups singing at once.

The full song consists of three sections:

1. Repeated single notes at constant pitch (1,200 to 1,300 Hz) and duration but increasing tempo
2. Repeated two- or three-note subphrases of slightly higher pitch with increasing tempo
3. Subphrases of up to 10 notes, shorter ones rising in pitch and longer ones falling, two-subphrase combinations increasing in number of notes and tempo and then decreasing in tempo.

Their song was sampled by Boards of Canada on their track "Happy Cycling" on their debut album Music Has the Right to Children, which was taken from the Vangelis album La Fête Sauvage.

== Diet ==
Red-legged seriemas are omnivorous, probably eating prey in response to its abundance. Diets mainly consist of arthropods (such as grasshoppers, beetles, ants and spiders), insect larvae, lizards, amphibians, snakes, rodents and other small vertebrates; occasionally, corn (Zea) grains and other crops, wild fruits and tree gum. In captivity, and probably even in the wild, eggs and chicks of other bird species are also eaten.

Seriemas typically feed alone or in pairs, seasonally in small family groups; they forage by walking steadily, looking for food on the ground or in low vegetation. Foraging birds sometimes remain obscured due to cryptic plumage colours. It grabs small vertebrates in its beak and beats them against the ground before dismembering them with its beak and claws.

During a long-term study in Arcos municipality, Minas Gerais, Brazil, a research team placed a camera trap at one of 44 seriema nests in their study area. On 29 September 2018 it recorded a 20-minute video of an adult killing one of three nestlings, eating part of it, and allowing the other two nestlings to feed on the carcass. It was the first documented parental infanticide and cannibalism by the species in the wild though it had been observed in a captive individual. The researchers note that very few red-legged seriema broods fledge three young and speculate that the third nestling serves as reserve food for the other two in times of stress.

== Reproduction ==
Seriemas are monogamous. In the wild, the breeding season correlates with the rainy months, from February to July in the northeast of Brazil, September to January in central Brazil, and November to December in Argentina.

During the breeding season, the male, more intimidating or forcing himself on the female, spreads out his wings laterally, moving them forward and displaying the contrasting arrangement of the flight feathers, a pattern similar to that of certain birds of prey, such as the African secretarybird (Sagittarius serpentarius). The display is often followed by a strut in front of the female, with the head pointing and the crest lifted. The male also gives food (from the normal diet) to the female. Both birds call, thereby reinforcing the bond between them as well as establishing the territories of the pair. Copulation takes place on the ground.

Typically, 2–3 white, softly spotted eggs are laid. Incubation is done by both sexes, lasting 24–30 days. The chicks are coated with long, light brown feathers and are fed by both parents; initially, they weigh around 40–60 g (1.4–2.1 oz). At around 14 days of age, the chicks are able to leave their nests. At this time, the chick is able to make a call similar to the adult's calls, although very faint, to attract the parents' attention to itself. Adult plumage is obtained in 4–5 months.

== Gallery ==
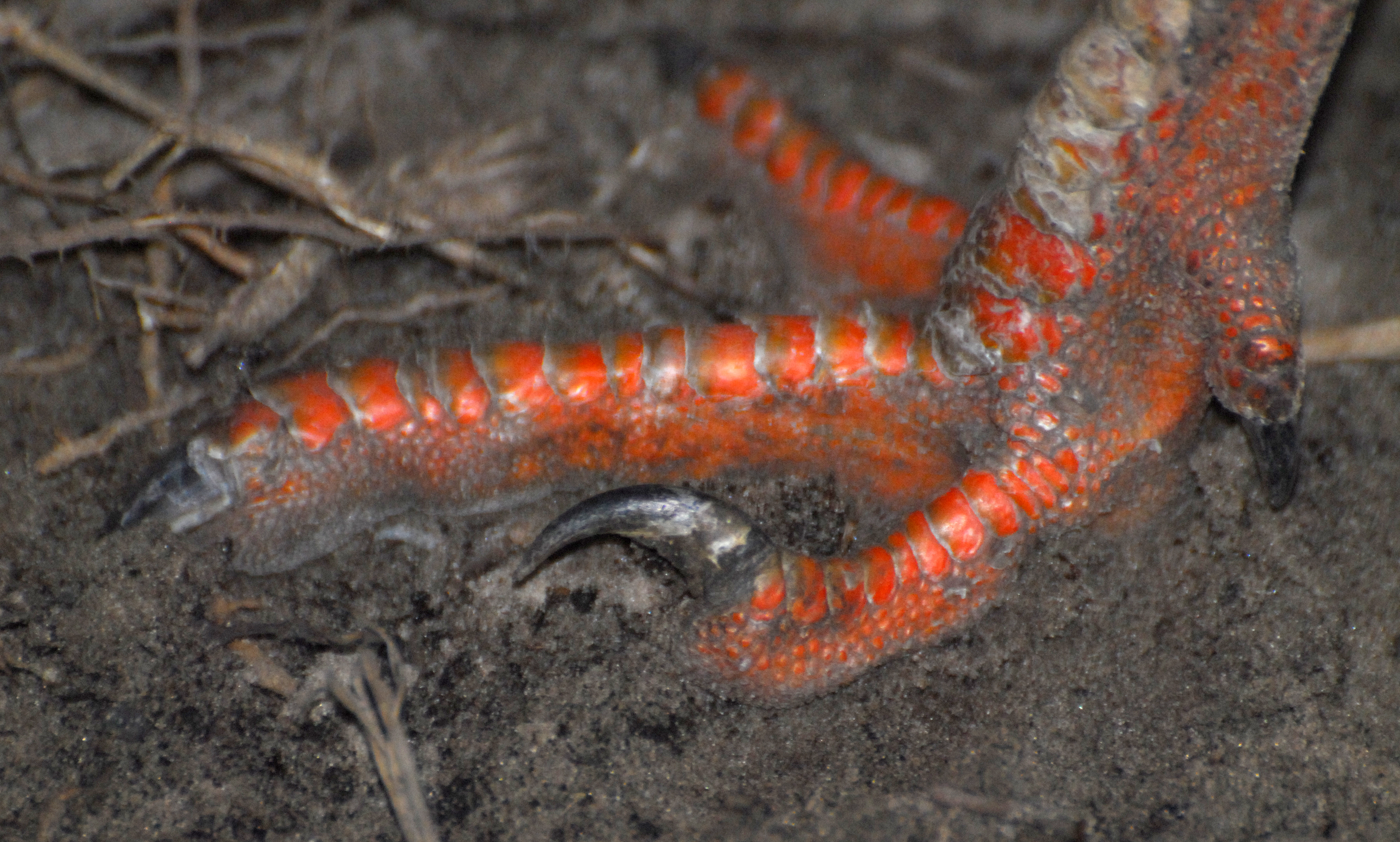
The sickle claw of a red-legged seriema resembles Dromaeosauridae, used in fighting

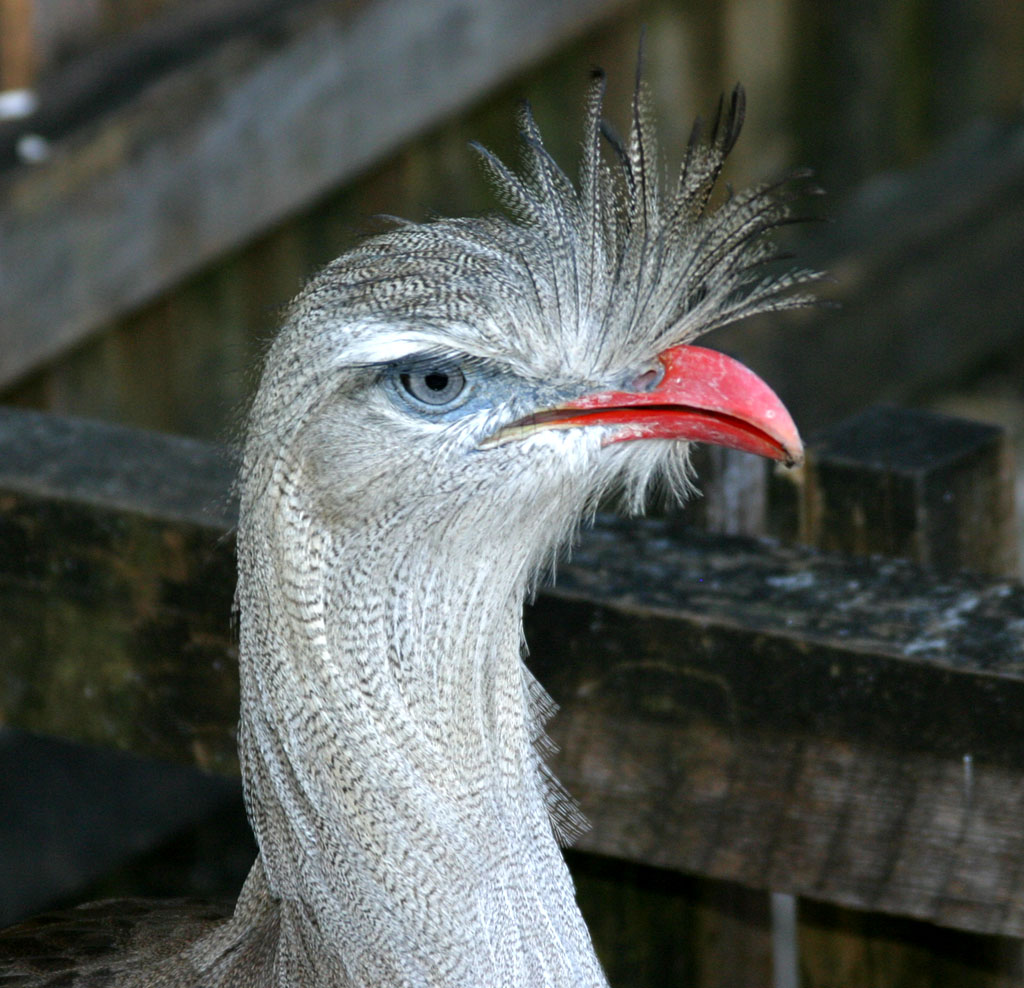
Closeup of head; Jacksonville Zoo & Botanical Gardens, Florida

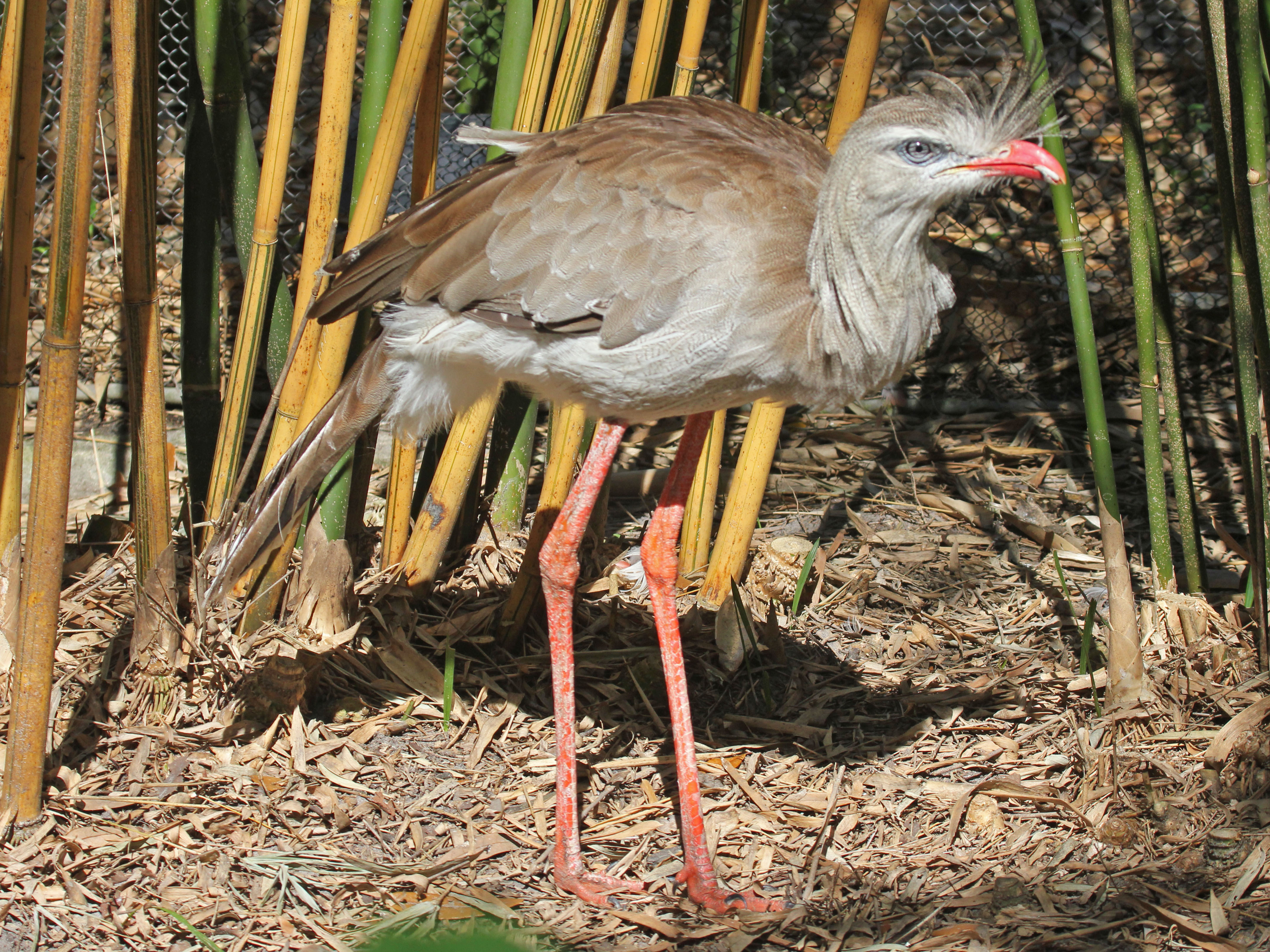
Jacksonville Zoo & Botanical Gardens, Florida

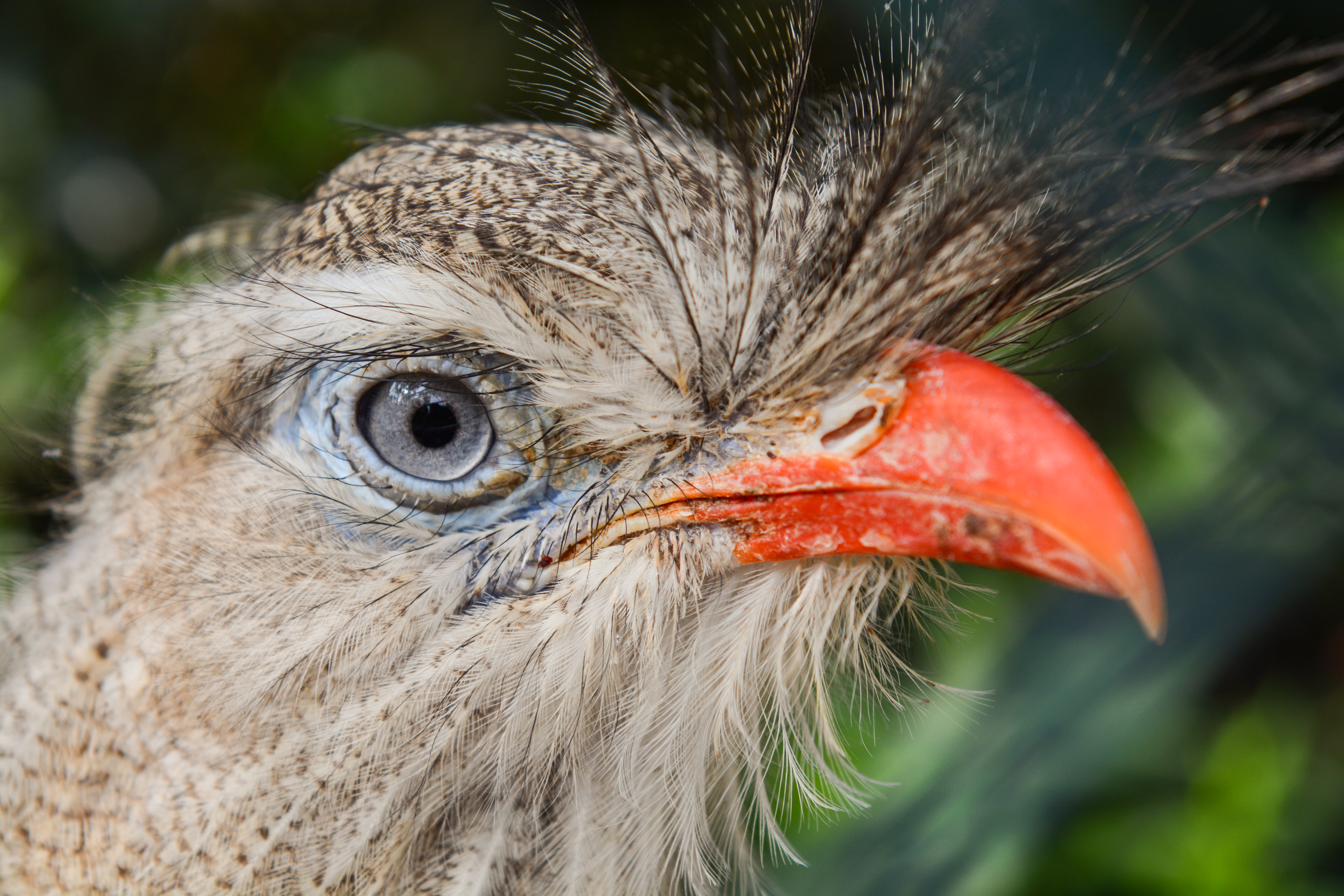
Weltvogelpark Walsrode, Germany

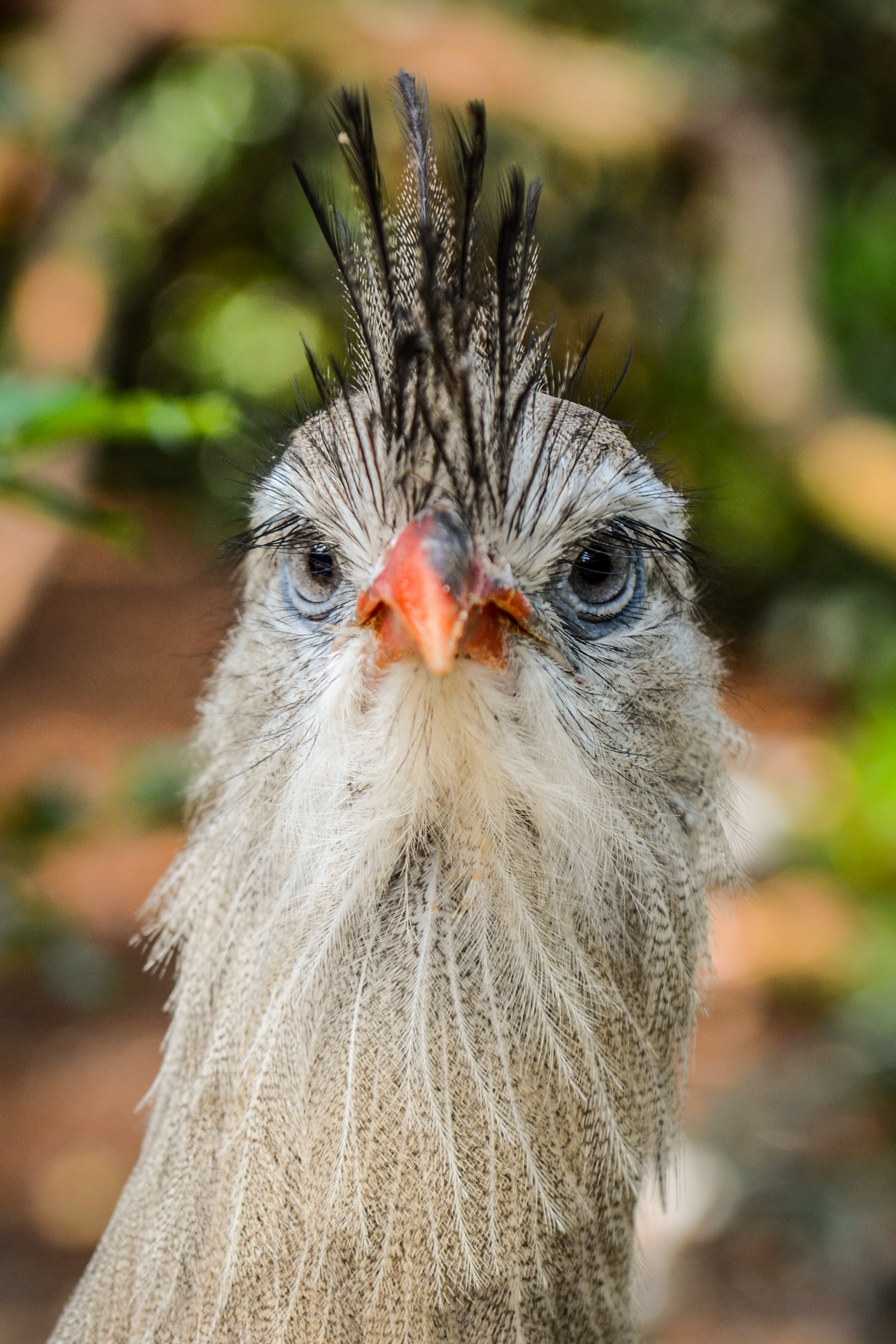
Front view of the head

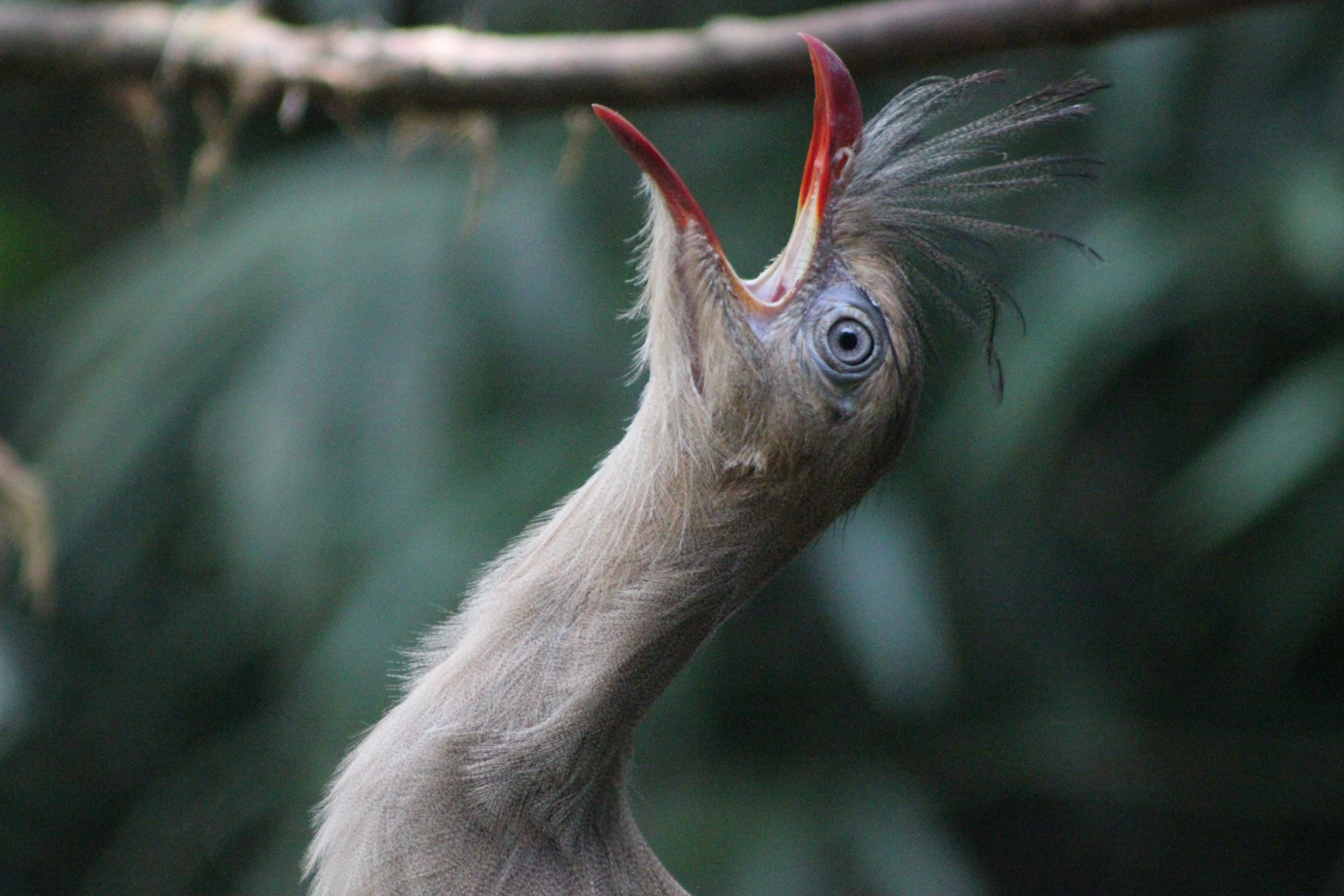
Screaming Cariama cristata at Parque das Aves (Foz do Iguaçu)

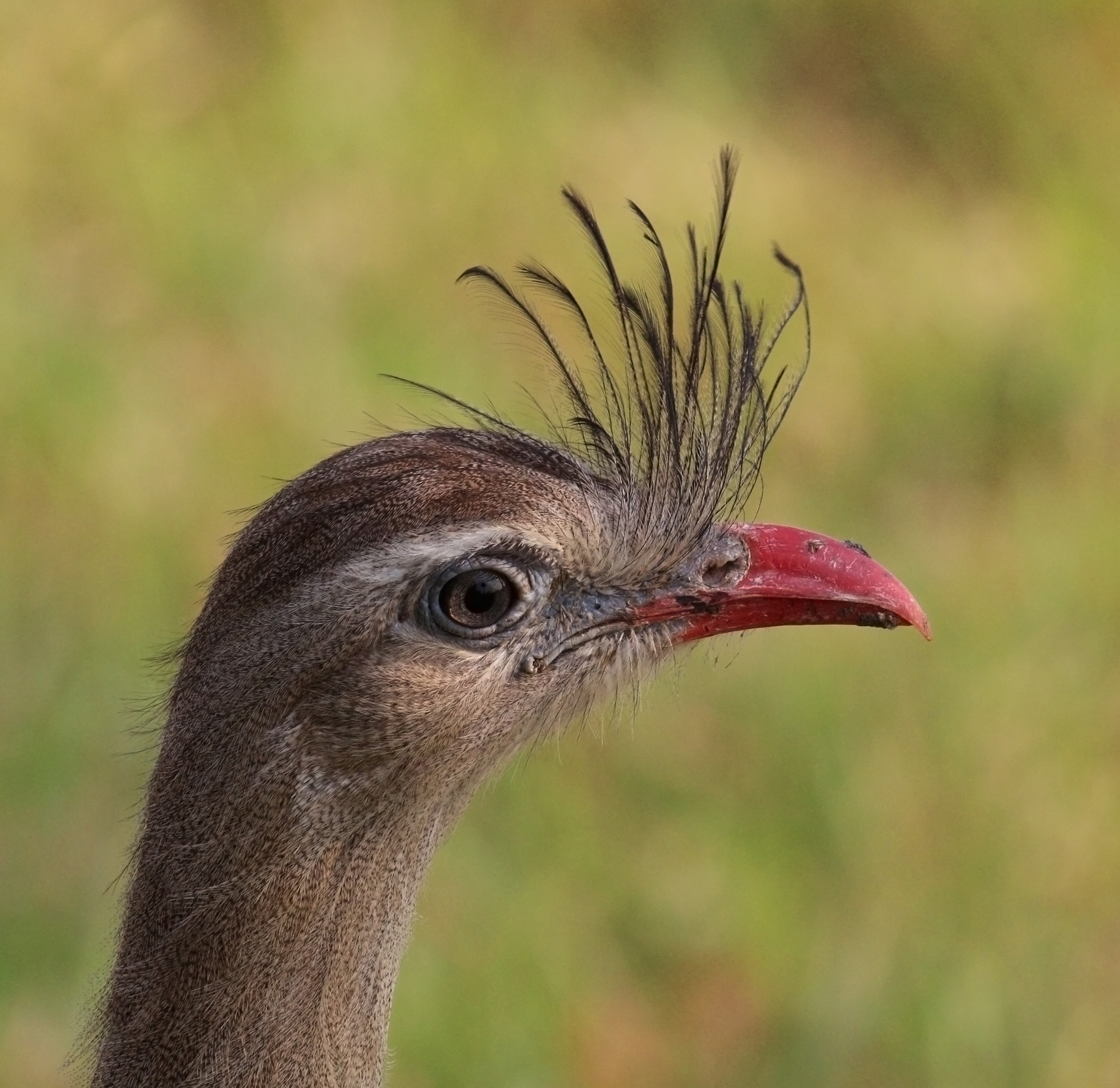
Pantanal, Brazil

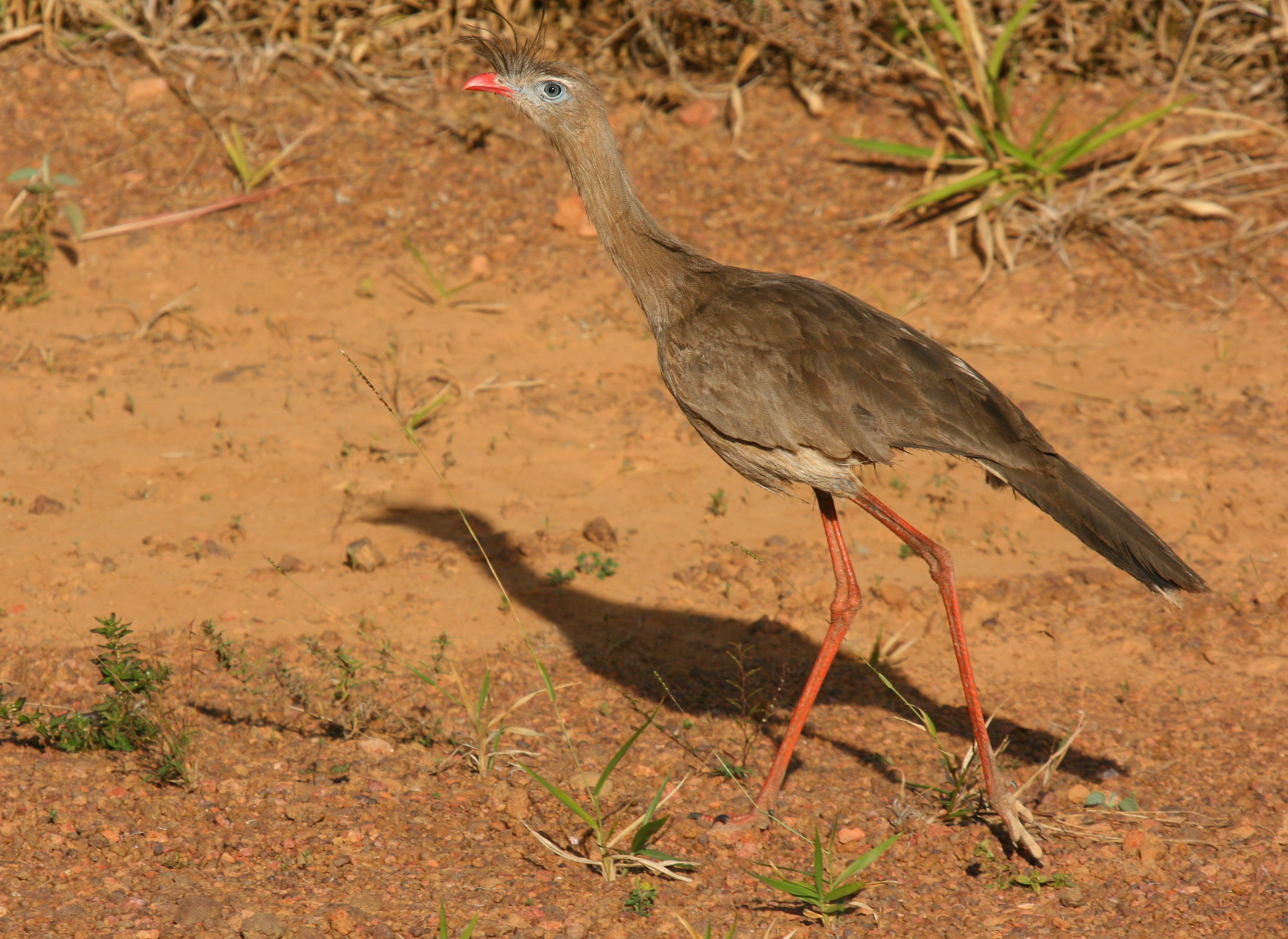
Near Goiânia in central Brazil
