= Teushentherium =

Teushentherium Temporal range: Oligocene (Tinguirirican-Deseadan) ~33–23.03 Ma

Scientific classification
- Kingdom: Animalia
- Phylum: Chordata
- Class: Mammalia
- Order: †Notoungulata
- Family: †Notohippidae
- Genus: †Teushentherium; Martínez et al. 2021
- Species: †T. camaronensis

Binomial name
- †Teushentherium camaronensis Martínez et al., 2021

Extinct genus of notoungulates

Teushentherium is an extinct genus of notohippid notoungulate from the Oligocene of Argentina. Fossils have been found in the Sarmiento Formation of Argentina.

== Etymology ==
The genus name, Teushentherium, is derived from Teushen, one of the Chonan languages of the Tehuelche, and therion, which is Greek for "beast". The specific name refers to Camarones, a typical coastal town of Chubut Province near the Barrancas Blancas locality.

== Description ==
This animal, only known from fragmentary remains, was approximately the size of a goat. Its skull was rather massive and had a short muzzle. The dentition was complete and continuous (without diastema), and the premolars and molars were high-crowned (hypsodont), like in its relative Rhynchippus. The premolars had a well-developed cingulum, while the molars were elongated. The shape of the premolars and molars was reminiscent to those of equids. Teushentherium, like its relatives, may have had a robust body with slender limbs.

== Taxonomy ==
Teushentherium was first described in 2021, based on fossilized remains found in the Sarmiento Formation in Argentina, in deposits dating to the Middle to Late Oligocene. Teushentherium was placed within the family Notohippidae, a family of toxodont notoungulates with horse-like teeth, with very high-crowned molars. More recent research, however, suggests that this group is paraphyletic, containing increasingly derived forms, some of them close to the ancestors of "true" Toxodontidae. In 2021, it was found to be the sister taxon to Mendozahippus.

The following position of the Toxodontia is based on Martínez et al. 2021, showing the position of Teushentherium.

- Toxodontia
  - - Pleurostylodon modicus
    - - Anisotemnus distentus
      - - Periphragnis harmeri
        - Thomashuxleya externa
  - - - Pampahippus arenalesi
      - - Plexotemnus complicatissimus
        - Puelia coarctatus
        - - Pampahippus secundus
          - Pampahippus powelli
    - - Pampatemnus infernalis
      - - Homalodotheriidae
          - Homalodotherium cunninghami
          - Asmodeus osbornii
        - Eutoxodontia
          - Leontiniidae
            - Gualta cuyana
            - - Coquenia bondi
              - Leontinia gaudryi
              - Scarrittia canquelensis
          - - - Pascualihippus boliviensis
              - - Eomorphippus bondi
                - - Eomorphippus obscurus
                  - Rosendo pascuali
            - - Eomorphippus neilopdykei
              - Morphippus imbricatus
              - - Eurygenium latirostris
                - Eurygenium pacegnum
              - - Patagonhippus canterensis
                - Patagonhippus dukei
                - - - Teushentherium camaronensis
                    - Mendozahippus fierensis
                  - - - Rhynchippus pumilus
                      - - Rhynchippus equinus
                        - Rhynchippus brasiliensis
                    - - - Moqueguahippus glycisma
                        - - Argyrohippus fraterculus
                          - Argyrohippus praecox
                          - Notohippus toxodontoides
                      - Toxodontidae
                        - Adinotherium ovinum
                        - Nesodon imbricatus
                        - - Toxodon platensis
                          - Posnanskytherium desaquaderoi
