= Moqueguahippus =

Moqueguahippus Temporal range: Late Oligocene (Deseadan) ~28.4–23.03 Ma

Scientific classification
- Kingdom: Animalia
- Phylum: Chordata
- Class: Mammalia
- Order: †Notoungulata
- Family: †Notohippidae
- Genus: †Moqueguahippus; Shockey et al. 2006
- Species: †M. glycisma

Binomial name
- †Moqueguahippus glycisma Shockey et al., 2006

Extinct genus of notoungulates

Moqueguahippus is an extinct genus of notohippid notoungulates that lived during the Late Oligocene of what is now Peru. Fossils of this genus have been found in the Moquegua Formation of Peru, which it was named after.

== Etymology ==
The genus name, Moqueguahippus, refers to the Moquegua Formation where it was discovered, and -hippus meaning "horse", an epithet used to describe most notohippids. The specific name, glycisma, is derived from the Greek word Glykisma, meaning "cake", in reference to the type locality, Pan de Azucar, meaning "Sugarloaf Mountain".

== Description ==
Moqueguahippus is a relatively large notohippid. Its skull was rather massive and had a short muzzle. The dentition was complete and continuous, lacking a diastema, and the premolars and molars were high-crowned (hypsodont), like in its relative Rhynchippus. The premolars had a well developed cingulum, while the molars were elongated. The shape of the premolars and molars was reminiscent to those of Equidae. Moqueguahippus, like its relatives, may have had a robust body with slender limbs. Its most peculiar distinctive characteristics were the cup-shaped internal cingula and the lack of cingula on the premolars, and a thick layer of cementum.

== Taxonomy ==
Moqueguahippus was first described in 2006, based on fossilized remains found in the Moquegua Formation in Peru, in deposits dating to the Late Oligocene. Moqueguahippus was placed within the family Notohippidae, a family of toxodont notoungulates with horse-like teeth, with very high-crowned molars. More recent research, however, suggests that this group is paraphyletic, containing increasingly derived forms, some of them close to the ancestors of "true" Toxodontidae. In 2021, it was found to be a derived notohippid, being the sister taxon of a clade including the Miocene genera Argyrohippus and Notohippus.

The following position of the Toxodontia is based on Martínez et al. 2021, showing the position of Moqueguahippus.

- Toxodontia
  - - Pluerostylodon modicus
    - - Anisotemnus distentus
      - - Periphragnis harmeri
        - Thomashuxleya externa
  - - - Pampahippus arenalesi
      - - Plexotemnus complicatissimus
        - Puelia coarctatus
        - - Pampahippus secundus
          - Pampahippus powelli
    - - Pampatemnus infernalis
      - - Homalodotheriidae
          - Homalodotherium cunninghami
          - Asmodeus osbornii
        - Eutoxodontia
          - Leontiniidae
            - Gualta cuyana
            - - Coquenia bondi
              - Leontinia gaudryi
              - Scarrittia canquelensis
          - - - Pascualihippus boliviensis
              - - Eomorphippus bondi
                - - Eomorphippus obscurus
                  - Rosendo pascuali
            - - Eomorphippus neilopdykei
              - Morphippus imbricatus
              - - Eurygenium latirostris
                - Eurygenium pacegnum
              - - Patagonhippus canterensis
                - Patagonhippus dukei
                - - - Teushentherium camaronensis
                    - Mendozahippus fierensis
                  - - - Rhynchippus pumilus
                      - - Rhynchippus equinus
                        - Rhynchippus brasiliensis
                    - - - Moqueguahippus glycisma
                        - - Argyrohippus fraterculus
                          - Argyrohippus praecox
                          - Notohippus toxodontoides
                      - Toxodontidae
                        - Adinotherium ovinum
                        - Nesodon imbricatus
                        - - Toxodon platensis
                          - Posnanskytherium desaquaderoi
