= Rosendo pascuali =

Rosendo pascuali Temporal range: Early Oligocene (Tinguirirican) ~33 Ma

Scientific classification
- Kingdom: Animalia
- Phylum: Chordata
- Class: Mammalia
- Order: †Notoungulata
- Family: †Notohippidae
- Genus: †Rosendo; Wyss et al., 2018
- Species: †R. pascuali

Binomial name
- †Rosendo pascuali Simpson, (1967)

Synonyms
- Eomorphippus pascuali Simpson, 1967

Extinct genus of notoungulates

Rosendo is an extinct genus of notohippid notoungulates that lived during the Early Oligocene in what is now Argentina and Chile. Fossils of this genus have been found in the Sarmiento Formation and the Abanico Formations of Argentina and Chile.

== Description ==
Rosendo was approximately the size of a goat, albeit with a more robust build. It had a heavy and sturdy skull, with a relatively short muzzle. The dentition was characterized by high-crowned (hypsodont) incisors, posterior premolars and molars. The teeth lacked cementum. The upper incisors were slightly protruding forward. The third upper incisor was wider than the other two, while the fourth premolar was more molariform than the other premolars, but devoid of a distinct hypocone. The upper molars had hypocones, with a variable but generally deep fissure separating them from the protocones. The fissure was blocked by the medial projection of a hooked structure. Apart from the permanent major fossa, the other fossae are erased with wear.

== Taxonomy ==
The genus Rosendo was first described in 2018 by André R. Wyss, based on fossil remains found in Patagonia, in deposits dated to the Early Oligocene. The type species is Rosendo pascuali, whose fossils have also been found in the Sarmiento Formation of Chubut Province, Argentina, as well as the Abanico Formation of Chile. Historically, the genus was originally attributed to the genus Eomorphippus in 1967, described by George Gaylord Simpson, but was subsequently found to be a distinct genus in 2018.

Rosendo is a toxodont, a clade of notoungulates, that developed a remarkable diversity of forms during the Cenozoic. Eomorphippus has been historically included within the family Notohippidae, which included several genera whose hypsodont teeth were similar to those of horses. This family, however, is no longer considered monophyletic.

The following position of the Toxodontia is based on Martínez et al. 2021, showing the position of Rosendo.

- Toxodontia
  - - Pluerostylodon modicus
    - - Anisotemnus distentus
      - - Periphragnis harmeri
        - Thomashuxleya externa
  - - - Pampahippus arenalesi
      - - Plexotemnus complicatissimus
        - Puelia coarctatus
        - - Pampahippus secundus
          - Pampahippus powelli
    - - Pampatemnus infernalis
      - - Homalodotheriidae
          - Homalodotherium cunninghami
          - Asmodeus osbornii
        - Eutoxodontia
          - Leontiniidae
            - Gualta cuyana
            - - Coquenia bondi
              - Leontinia gaudryi
              - Scarrittia canquelensis
          - - - Pascualihippus boliviensis
              - - Eomorphippus bondi
                - - Eomorphippus obscurus
                  - Rosendo pascuali
            - - Eomorphippus neilopdykei
              - Morphippus imbricatus
              - - Eurygenium latirostris
                - Eurygenium pacegnum
              - - Patagonhippus canterensis
                - Patagonhippus dukei
                - - - Teushentherium camaronensis
                    - Mendozahippus fierensis
                  - - - Rhynchippus pumilus
                      - - Rhynchippus equinus
                        - Rhynchippus brasiliensis
                    - - - Moqueguahippus glycisma
                        - - Argyrohippus fraterculus
                          - Argyrohippus praecox
                          - Notohippus toxodontoides
                      - Toxodontidae
                        - Adinotherium ovinum
                        - Nesodon imbricatus
                        - - Toxodon platensis
                          - Posnanskytherium desaquaderoi
