= Rosendo =

Rosendo is a Spanish male given name. The name comes from St. Rudesind, San Rosendo, in Spanish (907–977) who was Bishop of Iria Flavia at the time of Rodrigo Velázquez. Places named after the saint include San Rosendo, a town in Chile.

The best-known individual with the name today is Rosendo Mercado, known simply as "Rosendo" in Spain, a Spanish singer.

Other notable people with the name include:

- Rosendo Salvado (1814–1900), Spanish bishop in Australia
- Rosendo Domínguez (born c. 1940), Mexican baseball player
- Rosendo Mercado, Spanish musician
- Rosendo Fernández (es), Spanish painter
- Rosendo Huguet Peralta (es), Spanish missionary and philosopher
- Rosendo Mendizábal (es), Argentine musician
- Rosendo Radilla (es), Mexican politician
- Rosendo Canto (es), Cuban essayist
- Rosendo Salazar (es), Mexican writer
- Rosendo López, after whom a barrio(es) in Bahía Blanca, Buenos Aires, Argentina is named
- Rosendo Hernández, after whom Autódromo Rosendo Hernández (es), Argentina is named

== See also ==
- Rosendo pascuali, a notohippid notoungulate named in 2018
