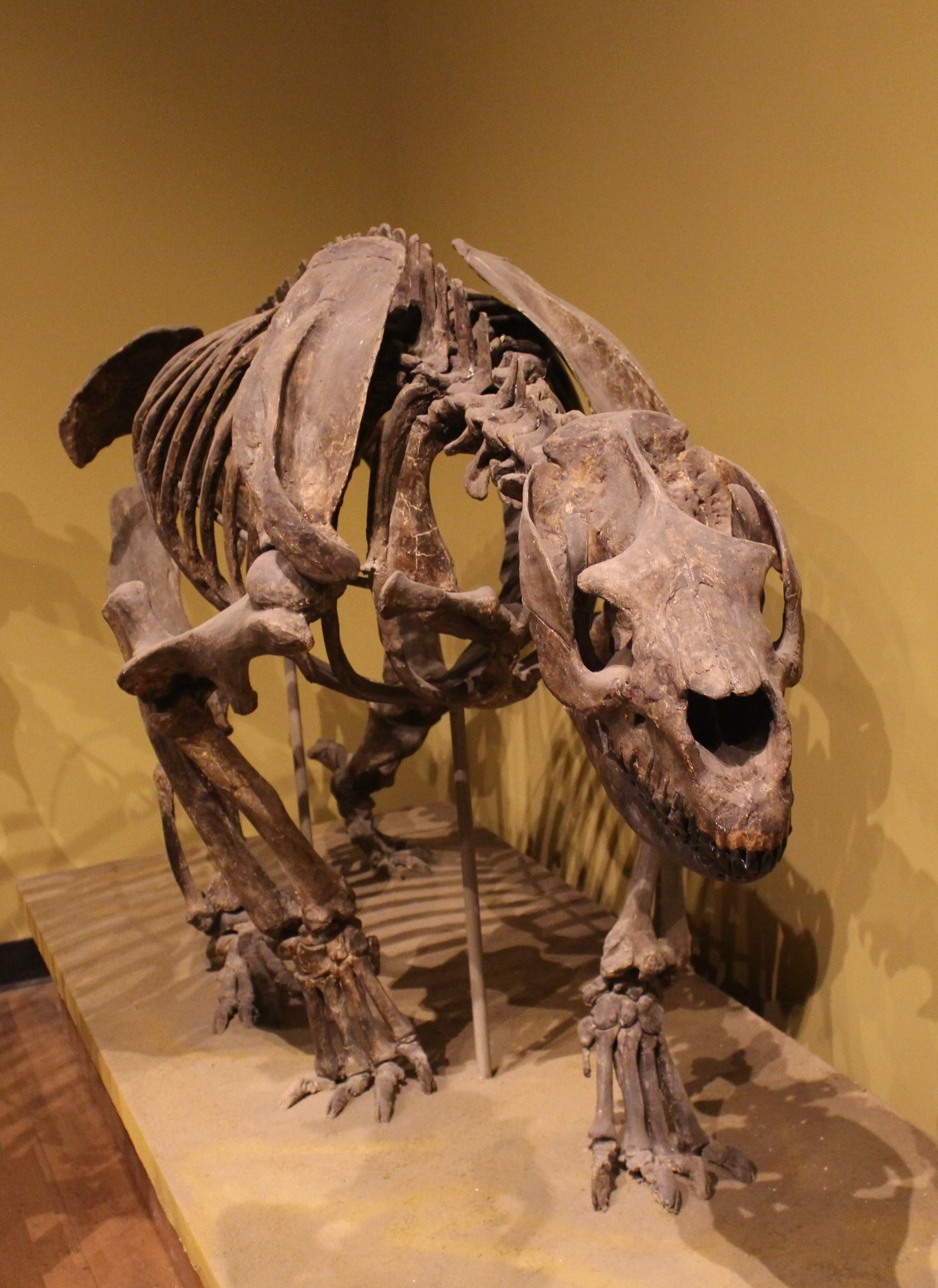
- Mounted skeleton of H. cunninghami in the Field Museum of Natural History, Chicago

Scientific classification
- Kingdom: Animalia
- Phylum: Chordata
- Class: Mammalia
- Infraclass: Placentalia
- Order: †Notoungulata
- Family: †Homalodotheriidae
- Genus: †Homalodotherium; Huxley, 1870

Species
- Homalodotherium canepai Bordas, 1941; Homalodotherium crassum Ameghino, 1894; Homalodotherium cunninghami Flower, 1884; Homalodotherium excursum Ameghino, 1894; Homalodotherium segoviae Ameghino, 1891

Synonyms
- Homalodon Burmeister 1891; Homalodontherium Trouessart 1898; Homalodontotherium Flower 1874

= Homalodotherium =

Homalodotherium Temporal range: Early-Mid Miocene (Friasian) ~16.3–15.5 Ma

Extinct genus of mammals

Homalodotherium is an extinct genus of South American native ungulates in the order Notoungulata. Fossils of Homalodotherium have been found in the Middle Miocene (Friasian in the SALMA classification) Santa Cruz Formation of Argentina and the Río Frías Formation of Chile. The first specimen, a partial skull, was discovered by Robert Holiver Cunningham while on an expedition to Patagonia. By the time it had arrived in England, it was degraded to the point where only a few elements remained. Regardless, in 1870, it was given its genus name by Thomas Henry Huxley, and its species name (H. cunninghami, after its discoverer) by William Henry Flower. The name was misspelled repeatedly over the years, leading to the erection of the family Homalodontotheriidae to include it, though this has since been amended to Homalodotheriidae. Since, then four more species of Homalodotherium have been named.

Homalodotherium was a fairly large animal, with a body length of 2 m (6.6 ft) and a body mass of 250–350 kg (550–770 lb). It had a proportionally small head with broad, flat, teeth, and, unusually for South American native ungulates, large claws on its forelimbs. Initially, it was suggested that these were used for digging. However, it is more likely that they were instead used for pulling vegetation to within the range of the mouth, which may have been supplemented by a prehensile upper lip (indicated by its retracted nasal bones). In these regards, Homalodotherium is convergent with chalicotheres, a lineage of perissodactyls that may have similarly browsed from trees.

== Taxonomy ==
=== Early history ===
In March 1863, the British Admiralty, at the behest of naturalist Charles Darwin and naval officer Bartholomew Sulivan, sent the latter to Patagonia to collect fossils from the banks of the Río Gallegos, along with his son and Scottish naturalist Robert Oliver Cunningham. At some point during this expedition, Cunningham recovered the skull of a large mammal. These, along with the other remains recovered from Patagonia, were returned to England; by the time they did so, the skull had degraded until only the teeth and part of the mandibular ramus remained. What remained came into the possession of English biologist and anatomist Thomas Henry Huxley. In 1870, Huxley presented the teeth to the Geological Society of London, whereupon he proposed the generic name Homalodotherium for them. Huxley gave the teeth to anatomist William Henry Flower of the Royal College of Surgeons, who, in 1872, wrote an abstract discussing them. In that abstract, he provided a species name for the new species, declaring it Homalodotherium cunninghami, in honour of its discoverer. Two years later, Flower published a paper describing the specimen in greater detail. Notably, he altered the spelling of the name, providing instead the combination Homalodontotherium cunninghami. He referred to several bone fragments found nearby and discussed whether or not they could be assigned to H. cunninghami, concluding that they could not.

In an 1880 paper discussing the mammals of South America, H. Gervais and Florentino Ameghino discussed the taxon, referring to it by the name Homalodontotherium, following Flower's 1874 paper. In a later work, Ameghino would mistakenly attribute that spelling to Huxley, and erect the family Homalodontotheridae to include the genus. Later, in 1894, Richard Lydekker amended the family name by adding a second "i" (thus rendering it Homalodontotheriidae), and mistakenly attributed the original paper by Flower to 1884. Subsequently, Ameghino wrote again on the taxon, using the original name Homalodotherium but retaining Lydekker's spelling of the family name. In a subsequent paper, though, he would refer to the family repeatedly as Homalotheriidae (and occasionally referred to Homalodotherium by Homalotherium. In 1910, William King Gregory finally provided the family with the current spelling of its name, Homalodotheriidae, though subsequent authors would continue to misspell it in various fashions. The matter of nomenclature would not be fully resolved until 2017, whereupon Homalodotherium and Homalodotheriidae were determined to be the correct spellings for the generic and familial names respectively.

=== Other species ===
In an 1891 paper, Ameghino described a new species of Homalodotherium, H. segoviae, based on a fairly complete skull. Three years later, he would go on to name two more species of Homalodotherium, H. crassum and H. excursum, both based on limb elements. In 1941, Alejandro F. Bordas described a fifth species, H. canepai, from the Rincón del Buque locality of southern Patagonia.

=== Evolution ===
Homalodotherium is a member of the Notoungulata, an order of South American native ungulates (SANUs). Notoungulates were the most diverse SANU lineage, with over 150 described genera in 13 different families. Homalodotherium belongs to the family Homalodotheriidae, along with Asmodeus, Chasicotherium, and Trigonolophodon, though the exact placement of that family has long been unclear. Richard Lydekker, in 1894, suggested that homalodotheriids fell under the Astrapotheria, and were thus sister to Astrapotheriidae. In 1910, Henry Fairfield Osborn proposed a sister-group relationship with Notostylopidae, with both families falling under the suborder Homalodotheria. George Gaylord Simpson suggested instead that homalodotheres formed a group, Entelonychia, with Isotemnidae. In 2017, Juan D. Carillo and Robert J. Asher performed a phylogenetic analysis of Toxodontia. They recovered homalodotheres, specifically Asmodeus and Homalodotherium, as a group of their own, basal to the group that includes Toxodontidae.

The below cladogram shows the results of Carillo & Asher (2017):

- Toxodontia
  - Pleurostylodon
  - - Ryphodon
    - - Thomashuxleya
      - Periphragnis
  - - Homalodotheriidae
      - Asmodeus
      - Homalodotherium
    - - Leontiniidae
        - - Coquenia
          - Martinmiguelia
        - - - Ancylocoelus
            - Colpodon
          - - Leontinia
            - Scarritia
      - - Puelia
        - - Eomorphippus
          - - Eurygenium
            - Morphippus
            - Rhynchippus
            - - Pascualihippus
              - - Argyrohippus
                - Toxodontidae

== Description ==
=== Size ===
Homalodotherium had a skull length of around 40 cm (16 in), and a total length of around 2 m (6.6 ft). In 2010, Andrea Elissamburu estimated its body mass at 1,150 kg (2,540 lb). In 2012, though, Guillermo Cassini et al. recovered a lower mass of 400 kg (880 lb), based on craniodental anatomy. Darin A. Croft et al. agreed with the latter result. The results of Allison Nelson et al. using a dataset founded on modern mammals, suggested that Homalodotherium weighed around 250–350 kg (550–770 lb).

=== Skull ===
The skull of Homalodotherium was similar to that of the related toxodonts. It was quite small, proportionally, compared to the rest of the body. The nasal bones were retracted, suggesting the presence of a prehensile upper lip (or, as proposed by William Berryman Scott in 1913, a proboscis). Homalodotherium had strongly projecting zygomatic arches. The orbits (eye sockets) were not closed off at the back by a postorbital bar. The occipital crest and sagittal crests were large. The pterygoid crests were different from toxodonts and typotheres in that they were wide and posterior (closer to the rear), with small and poorly defined pterygoid fossae. The vomer is long, stretching to the posterior, with the result that the fairly large choanae are completely divided. Such a division of the choanae is seldom observed in mammals, with taxa known to have a condition including the metatherian Thylacosmilus and the astrapothere Trigonostylops. At the back of the skull, the occiput (the back and lower part of the skull) overhangs the condyles. The occipital crest and sagittal crests were large, and the occipital crest has conspicuous notches, unlike in related genera.

=== Dentition ===
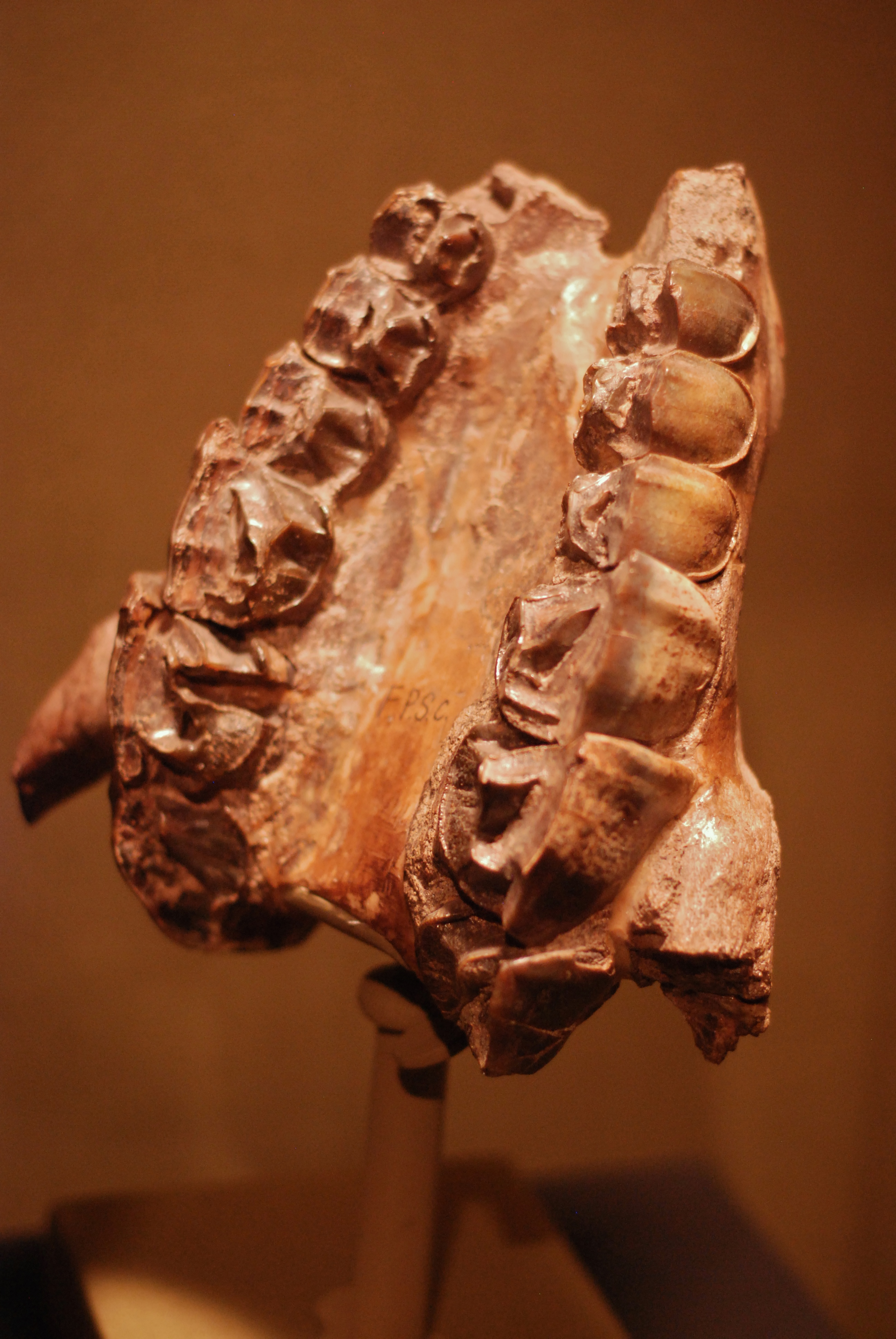
Homalodotherium cunninghami

Homalodotherium, unlike some other South American native ungulates, maintained the regular placental tooth formula, 3.1.4.33.1.4.3. The canines formed very small tusks which projected slightly. The cheek teeth (the premolars and molars) were broad and flat. The premolars of the lower jaw were generally smaller and simpler than the molars, save for the last premolar, which was essentially molariform (resembling molars). The structure of the molars was fundamentally the same as in toxodonts. Those of the upper jaw were simpler than those of toxodonts, however, and superficially resembled those of rhinocerotoids. Such similarities were noted as far back as 1872.

=== Postcranial skeleton ===
The cervical (neck) vertebrae of Homalodotherium are poorly known, with only the second (the axis) and seventh vertebra preserved. From what is known, there does not appear to be any strong elongation, and the neck is generally restored as quite short. The overall vertebral column (or, at least, what is known of it) resembles that of Nesodon. The deltopectoral crest was prominent and extended for most humerus' length, which has been interpreted as a means of increasing effective muscle force while browsing or digging. The brachial index (the ratio between the length of the humerus and that of the ulna) was higher than in any other clawed herbivorous mammal: the radius and ulna are long relative to the humerus. However, the opposite is true of the hind limbs, where the femur is long relative to the tibia and fibula. The humerus was stout, and the ridges where the deltoid and supinator muscles attached were very pronounced. The forearms were fairly flexible, as the radius could rotate on the ulna. The wrist, however, was not capable of much lateral (side-to-side) movement, which was likely compensated for by the flexibility of the forearms. The first metacarpal of the forefoot is vestigial, and does not appear to have supported phalanges (digit bones). The anatomy of the manus was convergent in many regards with that of chalicotheres, and likely was digitigrade. Most of the weight was likely borne by the third, fourth and fifth digits. Overall, the stance of the forelimbs was probably quite similar to that of the chalicothere Moropus. The hind limbs were structured quite differently, though shared the weight-bearing load on the outer digits.

== Palaeobiology ==
As far back as 1894, the ecology of Homalodotherium was a topic of discussion. Richard Lydekker noted similarities between its humerus and that of wombats, concluding that it, and other homalodotheres, were capable of using their large hand claws to dig. This view was shared with several other authors, such as Elmer S. Riggs. On the grounds of body size, burrowing was never seriously entertained as a hypothesis: rather, proponents of the digging model theorised that Homalodotherium might have subsisted on roots and tubers, using its large claws to access them. However, the overall skull structure is not dissimilar from that of other large notoungulates, and there is little morphological evidence, other than its claws, for burrowing. The anatomy of the hand was overall similar to chalicotheres, and may have been similarly digitigrade. Margery Chalifoux Coombs noted that, also like chalicotheres, Homalodotherium's was structured in such a way that it could be used to hook vegetation. Further, she noted that all proposed adaptations for digging could be easily interpreted as adaptations for forcefully pulling down vegetation while browsing. She concluded that Homalodotherium was likely convergent with chalicotheres. Andrew Elissamburu agreed with her assessment, categorically discounting the digging model.

== Palaeoenvironments ==
Homalodotherium is known from the Santa Cruz Formation of Argentina, and attributed remains from the Río Frías Formation of Chile and the Quebrada Honda locality of Bolivia. The first of these dates from the Burdigalian to the early Langhian of the early to middle Miocene (18–15.2 Ma). The formation is divided into three temporal intervals: localities FL 1–7, Barrancas Blancas, and Segundas Barrancas Blancas. Fossils of Homalodotherium have been recovered from all of these. In Río Frías, Homalodotherium is represented by a single, well-preserved maxilla from the collection of Santiago Roth, though these are sometimes treated as intermediate homalodotheres. The Quebrada Honda locality has been dated to the Laventan (13.5–11.8 Ma).

The depositional environment of the Santa Cruz Formation had a mean annual temperature of around 8 °C, and low precipitation compared to more northern parts of South America at the time. The cooling trend that began in the late Miocene had not yet occurred. The palaeoenvironment was likely fairly open, with temperate and semi-arid forests. Seasonal flooding occurred, likely leading to the formation of marshlands that hosted grasses and forbs. The mammal fauna of the FL 1–7 localities include the meriodiolestidan Necrolestes, sparassodonts such as Borhyaena and Cladosictis, several extinct marsupials (including Microbiotherium, a relative of the extant monito del monte), several armadillos (including glyptodonts), the anteater Protamandua, ground sloths (Eucholoeops, Hapalops, Hyperleptus, Nematherium, and Pelecynodon), notoungulates (such as Astrapotherium, Homalodotherium itself, Interatherium, Nesodon and Thoatherium) the chinchillid Perimys, the octodontid Spaniomys, the porcupine Steiromys, and the primate Homunculus. Birds are represented by ratites, anseriforms, gruiforms, pelicans, storks, falcons, and the phorusrhacids Patagornis and Phorusrhacos. A tegu in the genus Tupinambis and several iguanians and colubrid snakes comprise the Santa Cruz's reptile fauna.

The palaeobiota of the Río Frías Formation is fairly similar to that of the Santa Cruz. Metatherians are represented by a microbiotherian, sparassodonts, and paucituberculates, mostly Abderites. Bone fragments from euphractine, eutatine, peltiphilid and stegotheriine armadillos have been recovered, as well as a single glyptodont, Eucinepeltus. Other xenarthran clades are represented by Megathericulus and an indeterminate sloth. Notoungulates are represented by Astrapotherium, hegetotheriids, Homalodotherium itself, interatheriids, Palyeidodon, and Theosodon, as well as several unidentified, fragmentary litopterns. Rodents are known in the form of chinchilloids, dinomyids, dasyproctids, octodontoids and erethizontids. An indeterminate platyrrhine monkey is also known. At least two bird taxa have been recovered from the Río Frías, as well as osteoderms from terrestrial turtles.
