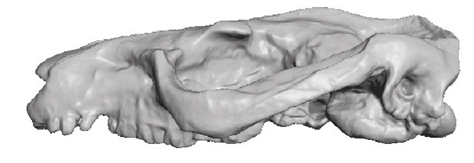
- Skull of Campanorco inauguralis

Scientific classification
- Kingdom: Animalia
- Phylum: Chordata
- Class: Mammalia
- Order: †Notoungulata
- Suborder: †Typotheria
- Family: †Campanorcidae; Bond et al., 1984
- Genus: †Campanorco; Bond et al., 1984
- Species: †C. inauguralis

Binomial name
- †Campanorco inauguralis Bond et al., 1984

= Campanorco =

Campanorco Temporal range: Mid Eocene (Casamayoran-Divisaderan) ~48.6–37.2 Ma

Genus of mammals

Campanorco is an extinct genus of notoungulate mammal from the Middle Eocene Lumbrera Formation, Argentina, South America and the only member of the family Campanorcidae. It contains only a single species, Campanorco inauguralis.
