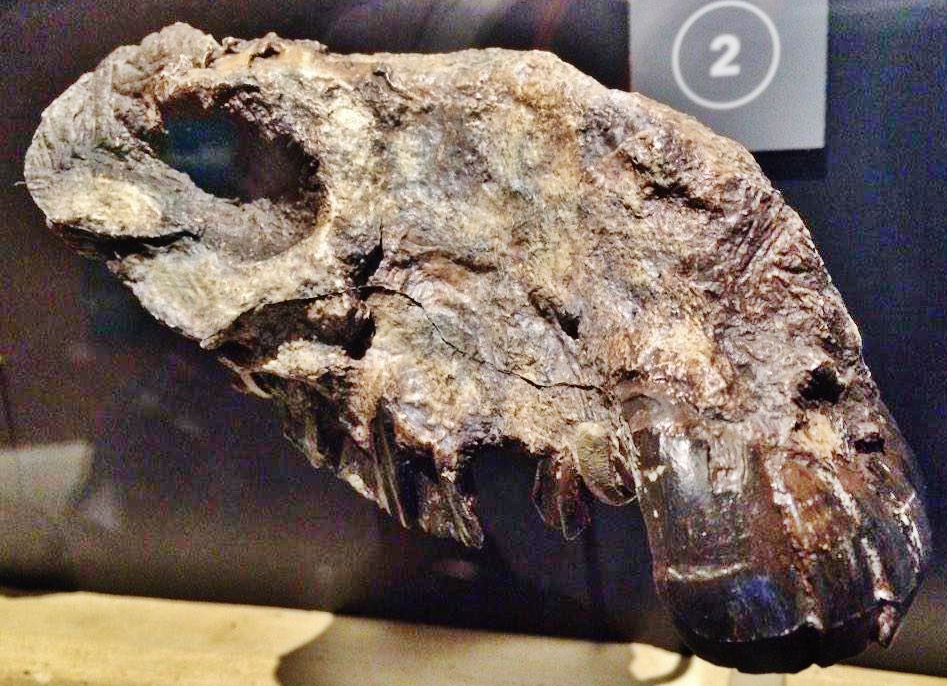
- Skull of Eomorphippus bondi

Scientific classification
- Kingdom: Animalia
- Phylum: Chordata
- Class: Mammalia
- Order: †Notoungulata
- Clade: †Eutoxodontia
- Family: †Notohippidae; Ameghino, 1894

Genera
- †Acoelohyrax; †Argyrohippus; †Edvardocopeia; †Eomorphippus; †Eurygenium; †Mendozahippus; †Moqueguahippus; †Morphippus; †Nesohippus; †Notohippus; †Pampahippus; †Perhippidion; †Puelia; †Plexotemnus; †Purperia?; †Rhynchippus; †Rosendo; †Stilhippus; †Teushentherium; †Trimerostephanos

= Notohippidae =

Notohippidae Temporal range: Early Eocene–Early Miocene

Extinct family of mammals

Notohippidae is a paraphyletic extinct family of notoungulate mammals from South America. Notohippids are known from the Eocene and Oligocene epochs.

== Description ==
Although the name notohippids means "southern horses," these animals did not resemble horses. The name refers to their teeth, which were very similar to those of horses, featuring sharp incisors and high-crowned molars suitable for shredding grass. The shape of the skull and, particularly, the dentition is the result of convergent evolution with the equids, perissodactyl mammals that developed on the northern continents. The body of notohippids was rather stocky, supported by relatively elongated legs equipped with claws (and not hooves). The earliest forms of notohippids possessed low-crowned molars, but over the course of evolution, the teeth gradually became more prismatic, and covered with a thick layer of cement. The skull also became longer, and as a result of this elongation, spaces formed between the incisors, canines and molars.

== Classification ==
The notohippid family was first described by Florentino Ameghino in 1894. The first notohippids developed during the Lower Eocene, Pampahippus arising from ancestors likely found in the archaic families Isotemnidae or Oldfieldtomasiidae. Later, over the course of the Oligocene, more specialized forms emerged, including Notohippus, Rhynchippus Eurygenium, Eomorphippus, Morphippus, Mendozahippus, Pascualihippus, Argyrohippus. One of the last forms attributed to this family, the large Colpodon from the Lower Miocene, is likely a probable aberrant representative of the family Leontiniidae.

The notohippids are part of the notoungulates, a large group of South American mammals that developed various forms of different appearances andsizes over the course of the Cenozoic. The notohippids, in particular, belong to the toxodont group, of which they are considered among the most basal members. Recent studies, however, indicate that the notohippid family is not a monophyletic group, but rather paraphyletic and therefore invalid in a cladistic sense, as it consists of increasingly evolved forms that are closer to the origins of other notoungulate groups.
