= Notohippus =

Notohippus Temporal range: Early Miocene (Santacrucian) ~17.5–16.3 Ma

Scientific classification
- Domain: Eukaryota
- Kingdom: Animalia
- Phylum: Chordata
- Class: Mammalia
- Order: †Notoungulata
- Family: †Notohippidae
- Genus: †Notohippus; Ameghino 1891

Species
- N. toxodontoides (type) Ameghino 1891

Extinct mammal of South America

Notohippus is an extinct genus of notoungulate mammal from the Early Miocene (Santacrucian in the SALMA classification) Santa Cruz Formation, Río Bote, Argentina.

== Description ==
Notohippus had high crowned teeth with cementum, similar to the situation of grazing equids.
