= Mendozahippus =

Mendozahippus Temporal range: Mid-Late Oligocene (Deseadan) ~29–21 Ma

Scientific classification
- Domain: Eukaryota
- Kingdom: Animalia
- Phylum: Chordata
- Class: Mammalia
- Order: †Notoungulata
- Family: †Notohippidae
- Genus: †Mendozahippus; Cerdeño and Vera, 2010
- Species: †M. fierensis

Binomial name
- †Mendozahippus fierensis Cerdeño & Vera, 2010

Extinct genus of notoungulates

Mendozahippus is an extinct genus of notohippid notoungulate which existed in Mendoza, Argentina, during the late Oligocene. Fossils are known from the site of Quebrada Fiera of the Agua de la Piedra Formation and includes a complete skull and two associated metatarsals, two maxillary fragments and five isolated upper teeth. It was first named by Esperanza Cerdeño and Bárbara Vera in 2010 and the type species is Mendozahippus fierensis.
