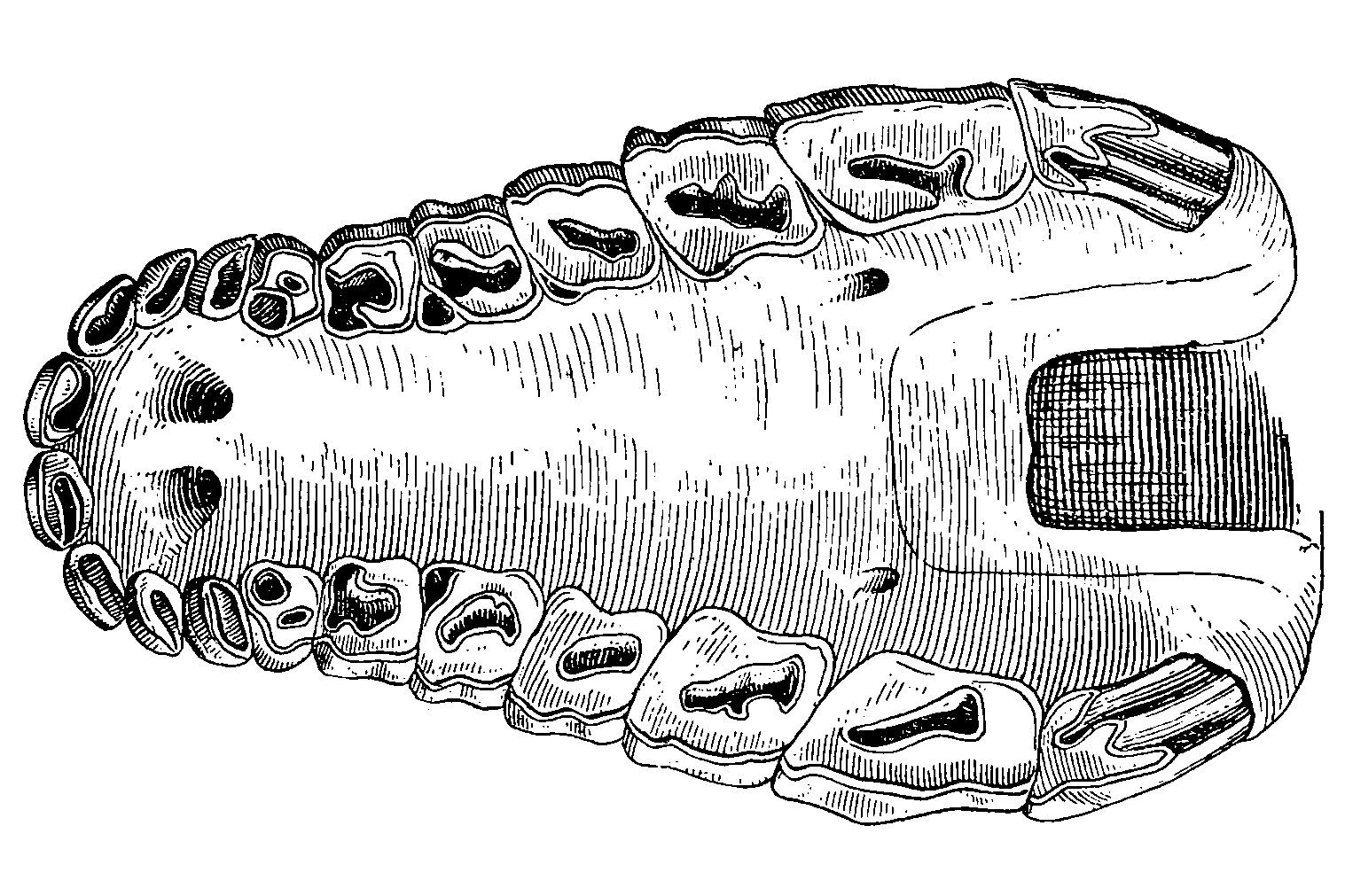
- Upper dentition of Morphippus imbricatus

Scientific classification
- Kingdom: Animalia
- Phylum: Chordata
- Class: Mammalia
- Order: †Notoungulata
- Family: †Notohippidae
- Genus: †Morphippus; Ameghino 1897

Type species
- †Morphippus imbricatus Ameghino 1897

Species
- M. complicatus Ameghino 1897; M. fraternus Ameghino 1901; M. hypselodus Ameghino 1897; M. imbricatus Ameghino 1897; M. quadrilobus Ameghino 1901

= Morphippus =

Morphippus Temporal range: Middle-Late Oligocene ~29–24 Ma

Extinct genus of notoungulates

Morphippus is an extinct genus of notohippid notoungulate that lived during the Middle to Late Oligocene in what is now South America.

== Description ==
This animal, only known from fragmentary remains, was approximately the size of a goat. Its skull was rather massive and had a short muzzle. The dentition was complete and continuous (without diastema), and the premolars and molars were high-crowned (hypsodont), like in its relative Rhynchippus. The premolars had a well developed cingulum, while the molars were elongated. The shape of the premolars and molars was reminiscent to those of Equidae. Morphippus, like its relatives, may have had a robust body with slender limbs.

== Classification ==
The genus Morphippus was first described in 1897 by Florentino Ameghino, based on fossils found in Late Oligocene terrains from Argentine Patagonia; the type species is Morphippus imbricatus. Numerous other species have been attributed to the genus, such as M. complicatus, M. fraternus, M. hypselodus, M. quadrilobus, M. corrugatus, but several of them may be synonymous with the type species or with Rhynchippus equinus.

Morphippus was a member of the family Notohippidae, a group of Notoungulates whose members developed teeth reminiscent of those of horses, despite not being closely related with Equidae. This family is considered by some researchers to be paraphyletic, and may include forms nested at the base of the family Toxodontidae.

== Bibliography ==
- F. Ameghino. 1897. Mammiféres crétacés de l’Argentine (Deuxième contribution à la connaissance de la fauna mammalogique de couches à Pyrotherium) [Cretaceous mammals of Argentina (second contribution to the knowledge of the mammalian fauna of the Pyrotherium Beds)]. Boletin Instituto Geografico Argentino 18(4–9):406-521
- F. Ameghino. 1901. Notices préliminaires sur des ongulés nouveaux des terrains crétacés de Patagonie [Preliminary notes on new ungulates from the Cretaceous terrains of Patagonia]. Boletin de la Academia Nacional de Ciencias de Córdoba 16:349-429
- G. M. López, A. M. Ribeiro, and M. Bond. 2010. The Notohippidae (Mammalia, Notoungulata) from Gran Barranca: preliminary considerations. In R. H. Madden, A. A. Carlini, M. G. Vucetich, R. F. Kay (eds.), The Paleontology of Gran Barranca: Evolution and Environmental Change through the Middle Cenozoic of Patagonia 143–151
