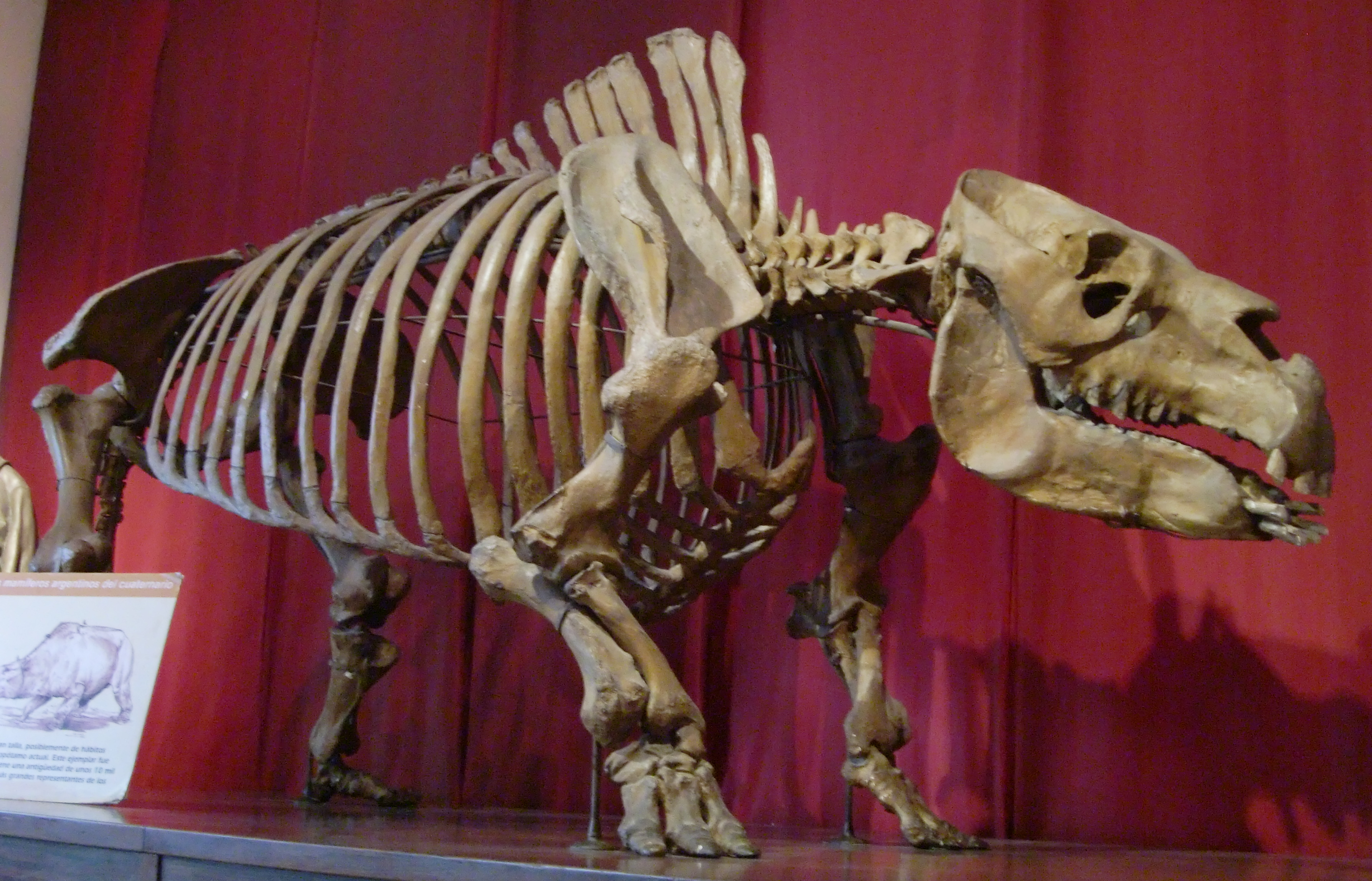
- Skeleton of Toxodon in Buenos Aires

Scientific classification
- Kingdom: Animalia
- Phylum: Chordata
- Class: Mammalia
- Order: †Notoungulata
- Family: †Toxodontidae
- Subfamily: †Toxodontinae
- Genus: †Toxodon; Owen, 1837

Type species
- †Toxodon platensis Owen, 1837

Other species
- †T. burmeisteri Giebel, 1866; †T. chapalmalensis Ameghino, 1908; †T. ensenadensis Ameghino, 1887; †T. expansidens Cope, 1886; †T. gracilis Gervais and Ameghino, 1880

Synonyms
- Genus-level: Dilobodon Ameghino, 1886; Chapalmalodon Pascual, 1957; Chapadmalodon Tonni et al., 1992 (lapsus calami); T. platensis: T. angustidens Owen, 1846; T. owenii Burmeister, 1866; T. gervaisii Gervais & Ameghino, 1880; T. aguirrei Ameghino, 1917; T. gezi Ameghino, 1917; T. burmeisteri: T. paradoxus Ameghino, 1882; T. protoburmeisteri Ameghino, 1887; T. bilobidens Ameghino, 1887; T. chapalmalensis: Chapalmalodon chapalmalensis Pascual, 1957; T. chapadmalensis Cione & Tonni, 1995 (lapsus calami); T. chapalmalalensis Oliva & Cerdeno, 2007 (lapsus calami); T. ensenadensis: T. giganteus Moreno, 1888; T. elongatus Roth, 1898; T. gracilis: T. voghti Moreno, 1888

= Toxodon =

Toxodon Temporal range: 5.28–0.012 Ma Early Pliocene - Late Pleistocene

Extinct genus of notoungulates

Toxodon (from Ancient Greek τόξον (tóxon), meaning "bow", and ὀδούς (odoús), meaning "tooth", in reference to the curvature of the teeth) is an extinct genus of large ungulate native to South America from the Pliocene to the end of the Late Pleistocene. Toxodon is a member of Notoungulata, an order of extinct South American native ungulates distinct from the two living ungulate orders that had been indigenous to the continent for over 60 million years since the early Cenozoic, prior to the arrival of living ungulates into South America around 2.5 million years ago during the Great American Interchange. Toxodon is a member of the family Toxodontidae, which includes medium to large sized herbivores. Toxodon was one of the largest members of Toxodontidae and Notoungulata, with Toxodon platensis having an estimated body mass of 1,000–1,200 kilograms (2,200–2,600 lb).

Remains of Toxodon were first collected by Charles Darwin during the voyage of the Beagle in 1832-33, and later scientifically named by Richard Owen in 1837. Both Darwin and Owen were puzzled by Toxodon's unusual anatomical features, including its long, ever-growing cheek teeth.

Toxodon has been found across much of South America, excluding southern Patagonia, the Andes and the northwestern-most region of the continent, inhabiting steppe, savanna and sometimes woodland habitats. It was one of several genera of toxodontids living during the Pleistocene also including Trigonodops, Mixotoxodon (which ranged as far north as the southern United States) and possibly Piauhytherium. Evidence suggests that Toxodon was ecologically plastic and able to adapt its diet to local conditions. While some authors have suggested that Toxodon was semiaquatic, isotopic analysis has supported a terrestrial lifestyle.

Toxodon became extinct as part of the end-Pleistocene extinction event around 12,000 years ago, along with most large mammals across the Americas. The extinctions followed the arrival of humans to South America, who may have been a contributory factor in the extinctions. Several sites have been found suggesting that Toxodon was butchered and possibly hunted by humans.

== Taxonomy and evolution ==
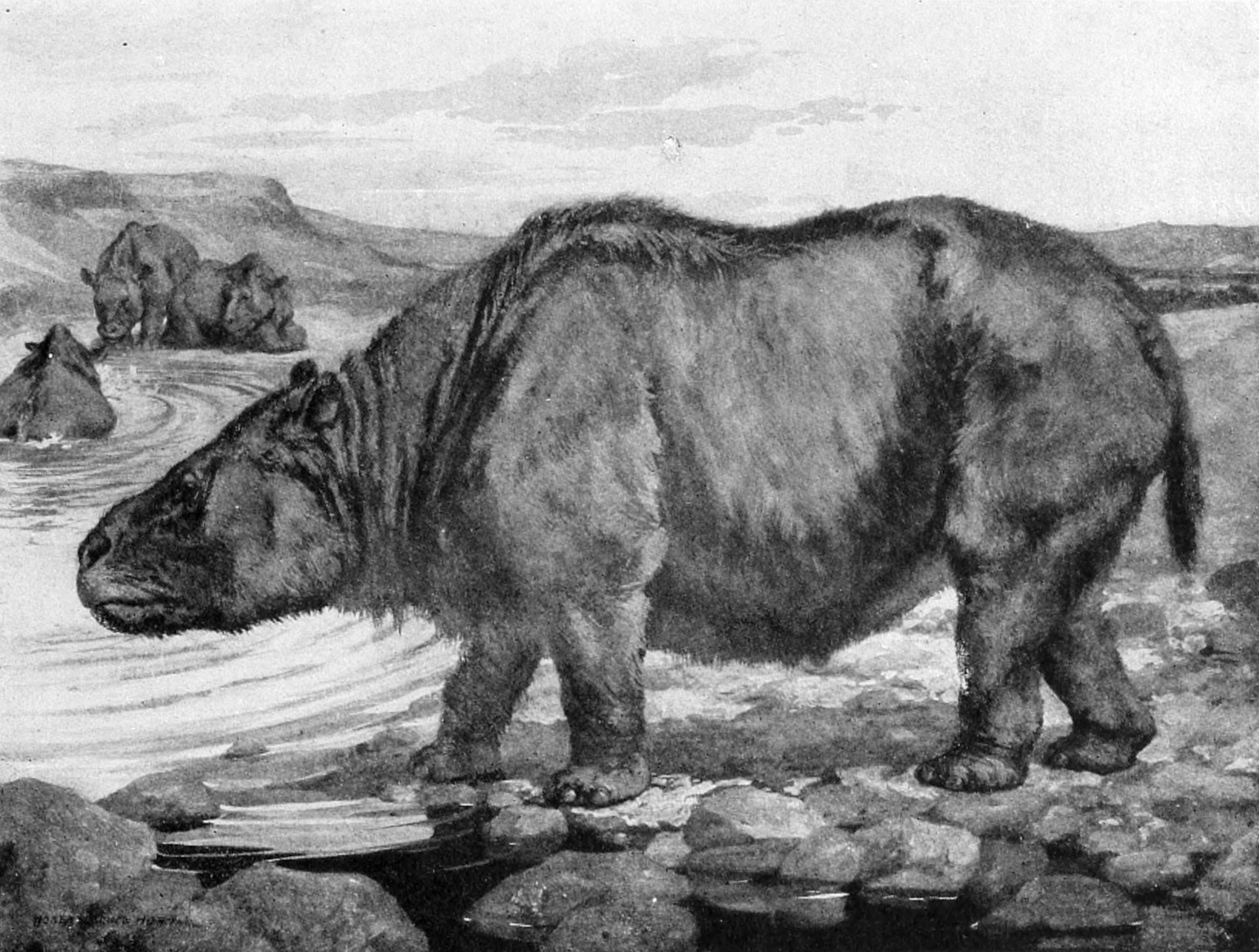
Historical restoration of Toxodon platensis from 1913

Charles Darwin, who was in South America as part of the second voyaging expedition of HMS Beagle, was one of the first to collect Toxodon fossils. In September–October 1832 and October 1833, Darwin collected several isolated teeth as well as a mandible from various localities in northern Argentina. On November 26, 1833, Darwin paid 18 pence (equivalent to £6.40 in 2018) for a T. platensis skull from a farmer in Uruguay. In his book covering the expedition, The Voyage of the Beagle. Darwin wrote, "November 26th – I set out on my return in a direct line for Montevideo. Having heard of some giant's bones at a neighbouring farm-house on the Sarandis, a small stream entering the Rio Negro, I rode there accompanied by my host, and purchased for the value of eighteen pence the head of the Toxodon." The skull had been propped up against a fence and been used as target practice for throwing stones by local children, who had knocked out its teeth. Since Darwin discovered that the fossils of similar mammals of South America were different from those in Europe, he invoked many debates about the evolution and natural selection of animals.

In his own words, Darwin wrote down in his journal,

Lastly, the Toxodon, perhaps one of the strangest animals ever discovered: In size it equaled an elephant or megatherium, but the structure of its teeth, as Mr. Owen states, proves indisputably that it was intimately related to the Gnawers, the order which, at the present day, includes most of the smallest quadrupeds: In many details it is allied to the Pachydermata: Judging from the position of its eyes, ears, and nostrils, it was probably aquatic, like the Dugong and Manatee, to which it is also allied. How wonderfully are the different Orders, at the present time so well separated, blended together in different points of the structure of the Toxodon!

Toxodon and its type species, T. platensis, were described in 1837 by Richard Owen based on remains collected by Darwin, in a paper titled "A description of the cranium of the Toxodon platensis, a gigantic extinct mammiferous species, referrible by its dentition to the Rodentia, but with affinities to the Pachydermata and the herbivorous Cetacea", reflecting the many unusual characteristics of its anatomy.

=== Evolution ===
Toxodon is a member of Notoungulata, a group of South American native ungulates that had been part of the fauna of South America since the Paleocene, over 60 million years ago, and had evolved in isolation in South America, prior to the arrival of living ungulates in South America around 2.5 million years ago as part of the Great American Interchange. Notoungulata represents the most diverse group of indigenous South American ungulates, with over 150 described genera in 13 different families. Notoungulates are morphologically diverse, including forms morphologically distant from Toxodon such as rodent and rabbit-like forms.

Analysis of collagen sequences obtained from Toxodon as well as from Macrauchenia, a member of another indigenous South American ungulate order, Litopterna, found that notoungulates and litopterns were closely related to each other, and form a sister group to perissodactyls (which contains equids, rhinoceroses and tapirs) as part of the clade Panperissodactyla, making them true ungulates. This finding has been corroborated by an analysis of mitochondrial DNA extracted from a Macrauchenia fossil, which yielded a date of 66 million years ago for the time of the split from perissodactyls.

Toxodon belongs to Toxodontidae, a large bodied group of notoungulates which first appeared in the Late Oligocene (Deseadan), ~28-23 million years ago, and underwent a great radiation during the Miocene epoch (~23-5.3 million years ago), when they reached their apex of diversity. The diversity of toxodontids, along with other notoungulates began to decline from around the Pliocene onwards, possibly as a result of climate change, as well as the arrival of competitors and predators from North America during the Great American Interchange following formation of the Isthmus of Panama. By the Late Pleistocene (Lujanian), the once great diversity of notoungulates had declined to only a few of species of toxodontids (belong to the genera Toxodon, Mixotoxodon, Trigodonops and Piauhytherium, the last possibly being a synonym of Trigodonops) with all other notoungulate families having become extinct.

Cladogram of Toxodontidae, showing the position of Toxodon relative to other toxodontids, after Forasiepi et al., 2014:

- †Notoungulata
  - †Pampahippus arenalesi
  - - - †Rhynchippus spp.
      - - †Scarrittia canquelensis
        - †Leontinia gaudri
    - †Toxodontidae
      - †Proadinotherium leptognathum
      - - - †Adinotherium spp.
          - - †Nesodon taweretus
            - †Nesodon imbricatus
        - - †Palyeidodon obtusum
          - - †Hyperoxotodon speciosus
            - - - †Nonotherium henningi
                - †Xotodon spp.
              - - - †Andinotoxodon bolivariensis
                  - - - †Dinotoxodon paranensis
                      - †Toxodon platensis
                    - - †Gyrinodon quassus
                      - - †Ocnerotherium intermedium
                        - †Hoffstetterius imperator
                - - †Posnanskytherium desaguaderoi
                  - - †Pisanodon nazari
                    - - †Pericotoxodon platignathus
                      - - - †Calchaquitherium mixtum
                          - †Mixotoxodon larensis
                        - - †Paratrigodon euguii
                          - †Trigodon gaudri

=== Species ===
There has not been a recent taxonomic revision of the genus Toxodon, leaving the number of valid species uncertain. The species Toxodon chapalmalensis is known from the Pliocene (Montehermosan-Chapadmalalan) of Argentina (5.28 Ma - 3.3 Ma), while Toxodon platensis, the type species, is known from the Pleistocene. The validity of other potential species like Toxodon darwini Burmeister, 1866, and Toxodon ensenadensis Ameghino, 1887 from the Early Pleistocene of Argentina is uncertain, and the species Toxodon gezi C. Ameghino, 1917 and Toxodon aguirrei Ameghino, 1917 have been considered junior synonyms of Toxodon platensis by recent authors. Some recent authors have argued that Toxodon gracilis Gervais and Ameghino, 1880, should be recognised as a distinct species from the Pleistocene of the Pampas significantly smaller than T. platensis, with these authors suggesting that T. platensis and T. gracilis represent the only valid species of Toxodon in the Pleistocene of the Pampas region. Other authors have argued that all Pleistocene Toxodon species should be considered synonymous with T. platensis.

== Description ==
Size of Toxodon platensis compared to a human. Scale bar = 1 metre (3.3 ft)

The bodyform of Toxodon and other toxodontids have been compared to those of hippopotamuses and rhinoceroses. Toxodon platensis is one of the largest known toxodontids and notoungulates, with an estimated body mass of approximately 1,000–1,200 kilograms (2,200–2,600 lb), and a body length of around 2.7 metres (8 ft 10 in).

The skull of Toxodon is proportionally large, and triangular in shape when viewed from above. All of the teeth in the jaws are high-crowned (hypsodont). Like other toxodontids, the upper and lower first incisors (I1 and i1) are large and protrude, with the second upper incisors (I2) and lower third incisors (i3) being modified into evergrowing tusks. The upper incisors display an arched shape, while the lower incisors project horizontally forwards at the front of the lower jaw. The wide front of the lower jaw with the horizontally-arranged incisors has been described as "spade-like". There is a gap (diastema) between the incisors and the cheek teeth. Like other derived toxodontids, Toxodon had long, ever-growing (hypselodont) cheek (premolar and molar) teeth, with the name Toxodon deriving from the curved shape of the upper molars, which are bowed inwards towards the midline of the skull to fit in the upper jaw. Evergrowing cheek teeth are unknown in any living ungulates (though they occur in the extinct rhinoceros Elasmotherium), but are present in some other mammal groups like wombats and rodents. The surface of the cheek teeth is primarily composed of dentine. The mandibular molars of T. platensis exhibited significant morphological variability dependent on geographic location, which was likely related to different diets across space; specimens from Mesopotamia (a region of northeast Argentina just west of Uruguay) exhibit highly robust trigonids, while T. platensis populations from northwestern Argentina had noticeably slenderer lower molars.

The thoracic vertebrae of Toxodon have elongate neural spines, which likely anchored muscles and ligaments which supported the large head. The legs of Toxodon are relatively short, with their bones being robust. The hindlimb is considerably longer than the forelimb. While William Berryman Scott suggested in 1912 that Toxodon habitually held its neck and head relatively low, a 1994 study suggested that Toxodon instead likely held its head in a more raised posture. Although Toxodon has been historically reconstructed in museum mounts with bent limbs, the ulna of the forelimb has a strongly backwardly projecting olecranon process similar to that of rhinos, suggesting that the front legs and likely the hind legs were held extended straight beneath the body when standing. The (distal) part of the femur closest to the foot shows a pronounced medial trochlear ridge, which has been suggested to have served along with the patella (kneecap) to allow the knees to be locked when standing akin to the stay apparatus of living horses as an energy saving mechanism. There are three functional digits on each foot, which are tipped with hoof-like phalanges.

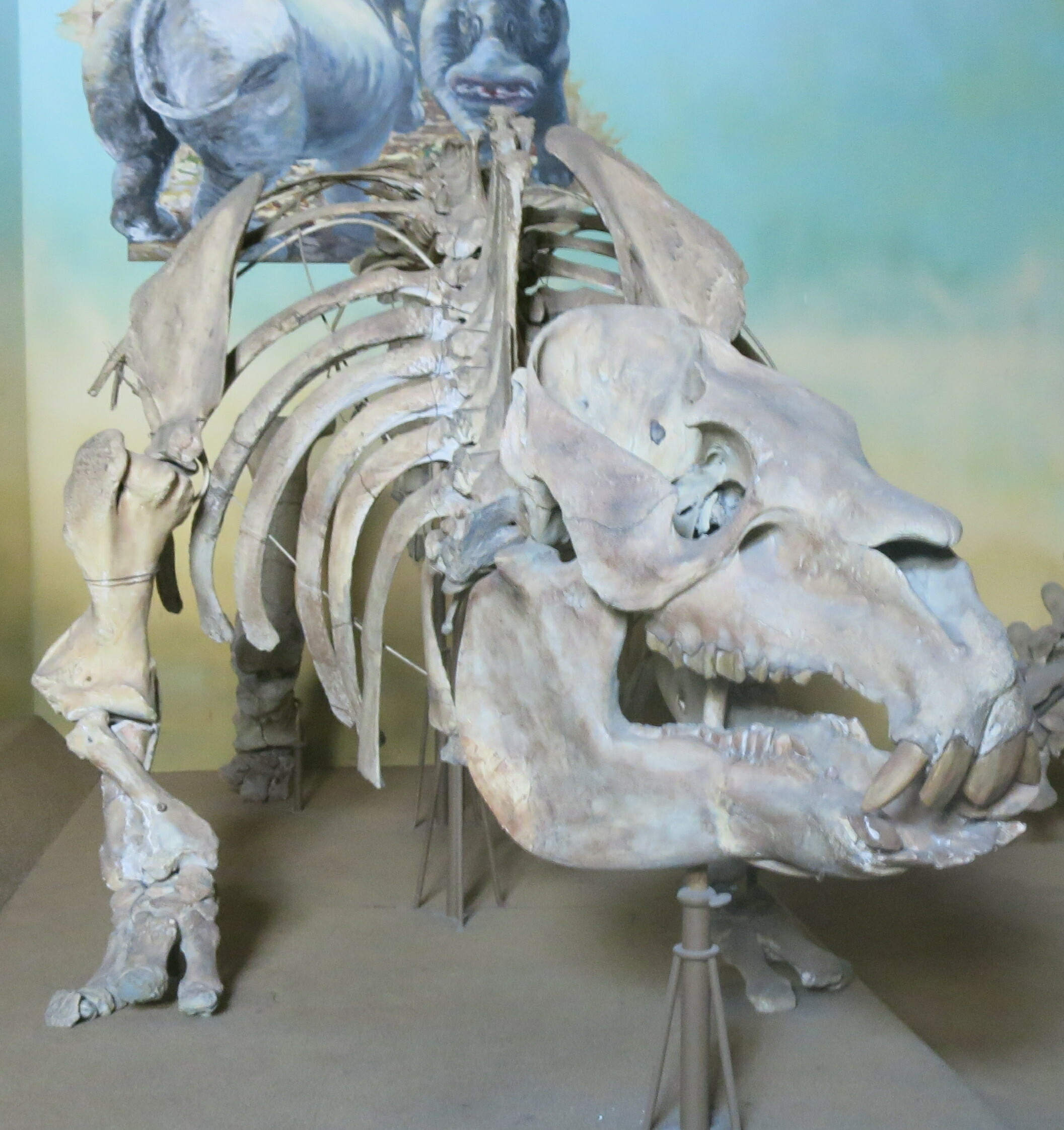
Mount at Museo de La Plata, Argentina

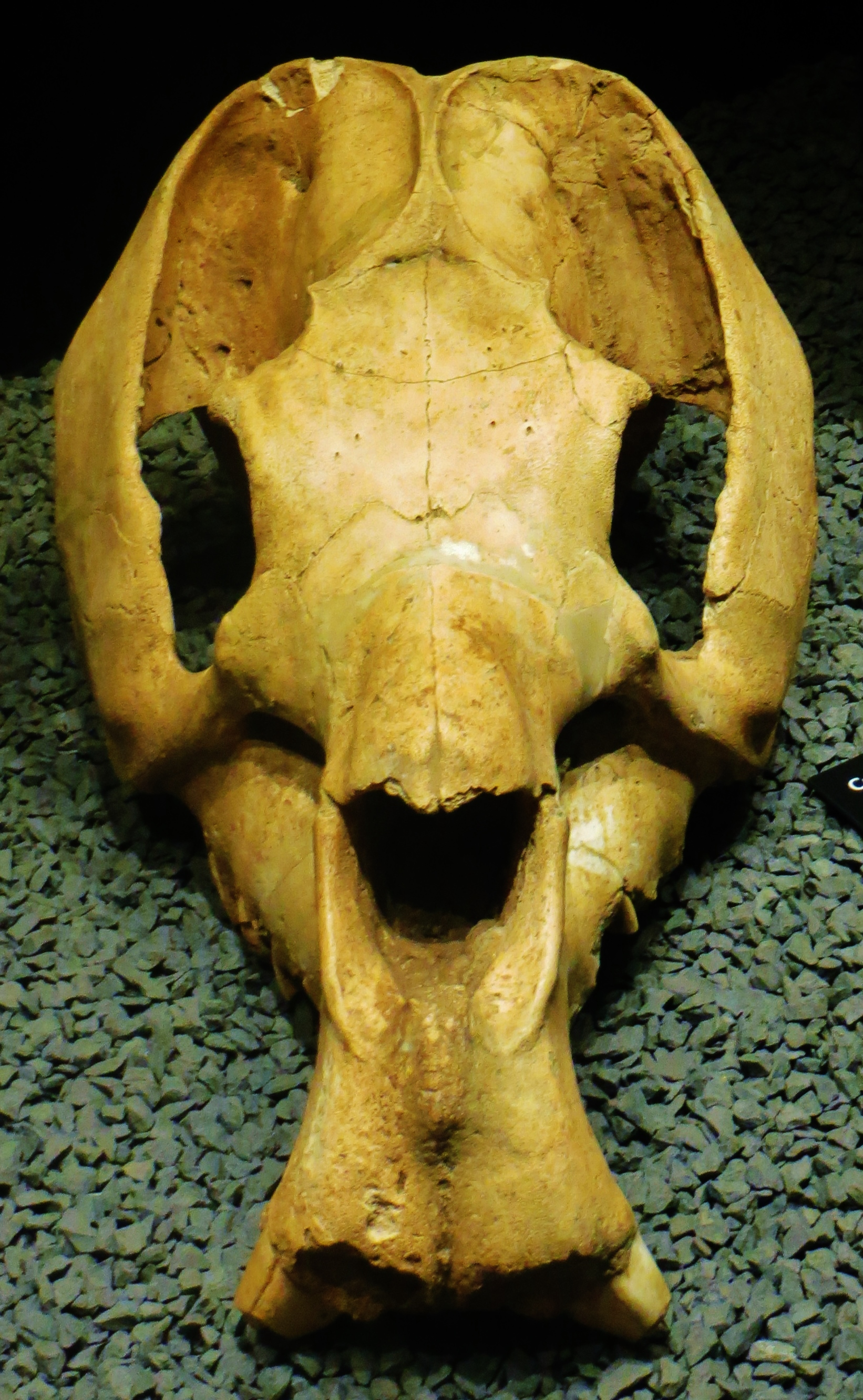
Skull in front-on view

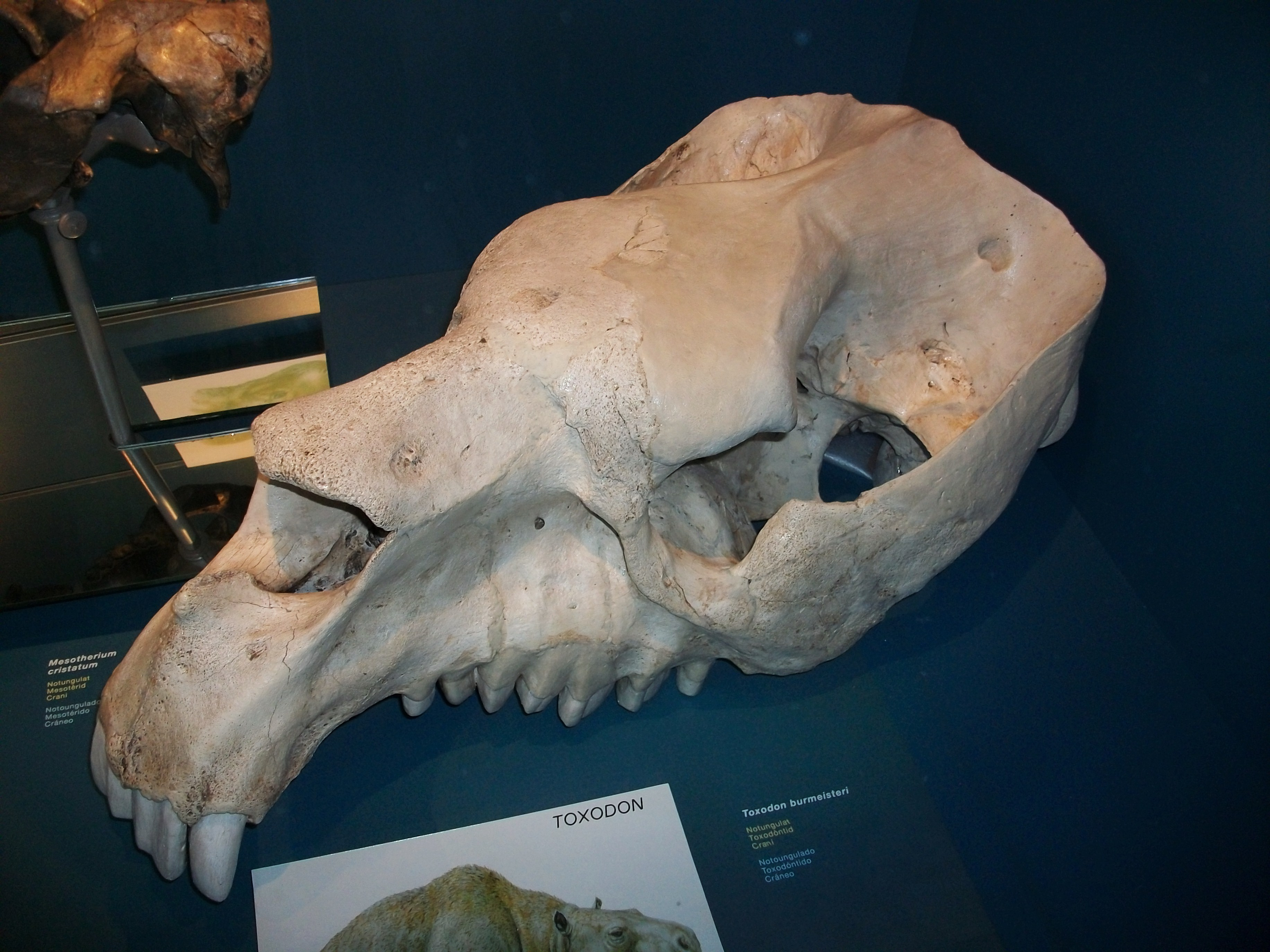
Skull in oblique view

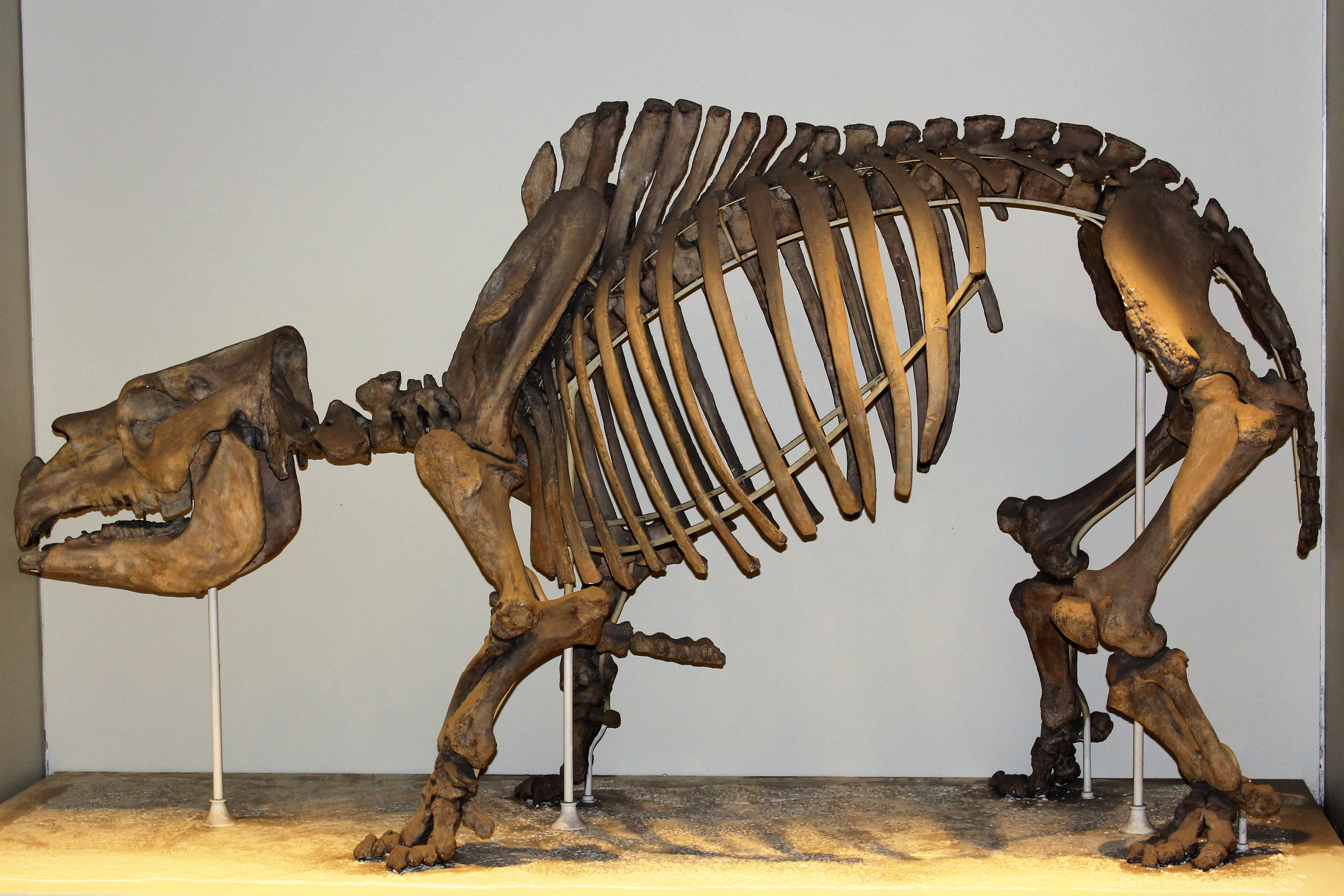
Skeleton in side-on view as traditionally reconstructed with bent forelimbs and low head

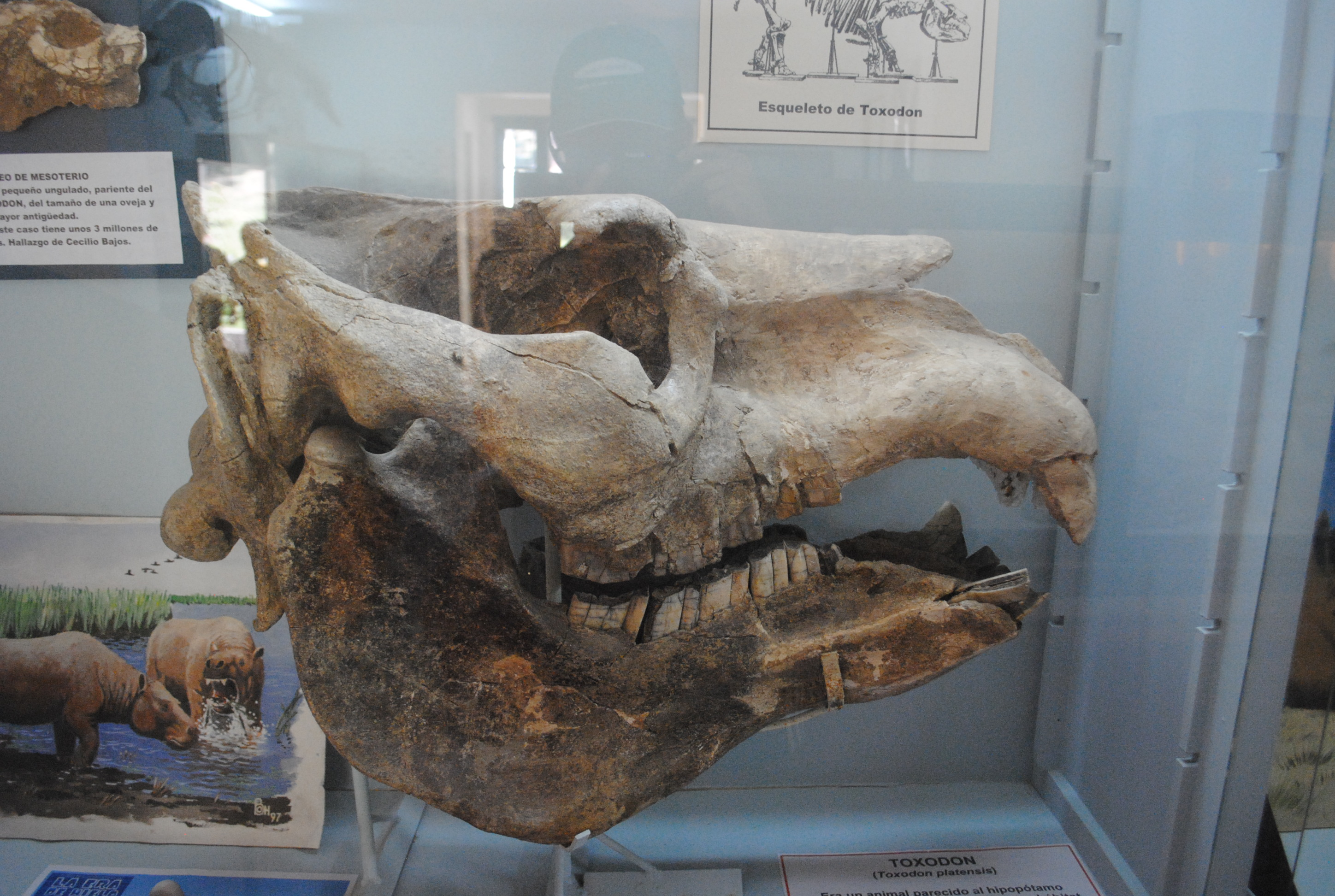
Skull in side-on view

== Distribution ==
Toxodon had a widespread distribution in South America east of the Andes, ranging from northern Argentina and Bolivia to the western Amazon on the Peru-Brazil border, to Northeast Brazil. Although some authors suggest that the distribution of Toxodon extended into Venezuela, other authors suggest that the related Mixotoxodon (which ranged as far north as the southern United States) was the only toxodontid present in the region during the Pleistocene.

== Palaeobiology ==
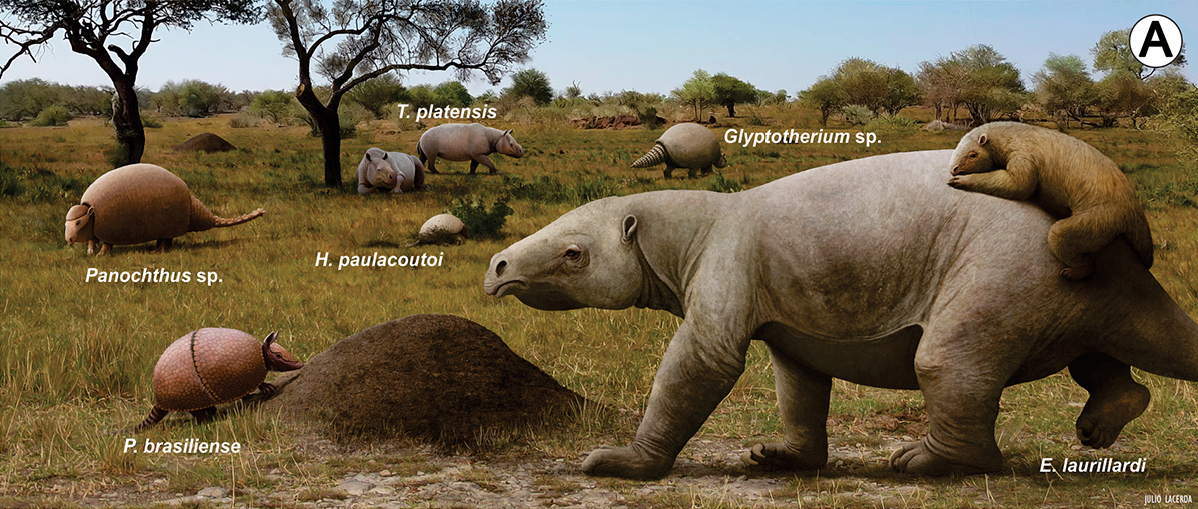
Life restoration of Toxodon platensis (background centre-left) in a Pleistocene Brazilian landscape, alongside the giant ground sloth Eremotherium laurillardi (foreground right), the glyptodonts Glyptotherium and Panochthus, the pampathere Holmesina paulacoutoi (midground centre-left) and the armadillo Pachyarmatherium brasiliense (foreground left)

Although some authors have suggested that Toxodon was semiaquatic based on the similarity of some aspects of its anatomy to hippopotamuses, this has been disputed by other authors, and analysis of oxygen isotope ratios (which differ between terrestrial and aquatic animals) suggests a terrestrial lifestyle for Toxodon. As such, it has been suggested that Toxodon was probably more ecologically comparable to rhinoceroses.

Toxodon is suggested to have been capable of moving at considerable speed. Toxodon is believed to have been ecologically plastic and have had a wide niche breadth, with its diet varying according to local conditions, with an almost totally C_{3} browsing diet in the Amazon rainforest, mixed feeding C_{3} in Bahia and the Pampas, and an almost completely C_{4} dominated grazing diet in the Chaco. Within the Brazilian Intertropical Region (BIR), T. platensis was a mixed feeder; seasonal variations in the BIR had little impact on the diet of T. platensis. Although Toxodon is thought to have inhabited open landscapes like steppe and savannah, in some areas like the southwestern Brazilian Amazon, it is suggested to have inhabited woodland.

Like living animals of similar size, it has been suggested that Toxodon probably only gave birth to a single offspring at a time.

T. platensis bones have been found displaying signs of disease like osteomyelitis and spondyloarthropathies. The teeth of Toxodon often display enamel hypoplasia (loss of tooth enamel) in the form of grooves and pits, which is likely due to their evergrowing nature and/or environmental stresses.

Tracks probably attributable to Toxodon have been reported from eastern Pernambuco in Northeast Brazil.

Isotopic analysis suggests that Toxodon may have been predated upon by the large sabertooth cat Smilodon populator, the apex predator of South American ecosystems during much of the Pleistocene.

In the Pampas, other contemporaneous megafauna to Toxodon included the elephant-sized ground sloths Megatherium and Lestodon, along with the smaller (but still large) ground sloths Mylodon, Glossotherium, and Scelidotherium, the glyptodonts (very large armadillos with fused round carapaces covering the body) Glyptodon, Doedicurus, and Panochthus, the long-necked camel-sized ungulate Macrauchenia, the gomphothere (elephant-relative) Notiomastodon, the equines Hippidion and Equus neogeus, and the large short-faced bear Arctotherium.

== Extinction ==
Toxodon and the other remaining toxodontids became extinct at the end of the Late Pleistocene around 12,000 years as part of the end-Pleistocene extinction event alongside almost all other large animals in South America. Mid-Holocene dates for Toxodon and Pampas other megafauna have been questioned and are suggested to be the result of contamination. These extinctions followed the first arrival of humans in the Americas, and it has been suggested human hunting may have been a casual factor in the extinctions. Several sites record apparent interactions between Toxodon and humans. Remains of Toxodon from the Arroyo Seco 2 site in the Pampas are associated with unambiguously butchered megafauna, but it is unclear if the Toxodon itself was actually butchered or the remains were naturally transported to the site. At the Paso Otero 5 site in the Pampas of northeast Argentina, burned bones of Toxodon alongside those of numerous other extinct megafauna species are associated with Fishtail points (a type of knapped stone spear point common across South America at the end of the Pleistocene, suggested to be used to hunt large mammals). The bones of the megafauna were probably deliberately burned as fuel. No cut marks are visible on the vast majority of bones at the site (with only one bone of a llama possibly displaying any butchery marks), which may be due to the burning degrading the bones. Various remains of Toxodon platensis in the collection of the Museum national d'Histoire naturelle collected from the Pampas region in the 19th century including a femur, an iliac fragment, a tibia, as well as a mandible (the latter of which has been radiocarbon dated to around 13,000 years ago), have been found to display cut marks indicative of butchery.
