= Asmodeus (mammal) =

Asmodeus Temporal range: Late Oligocene ~29–23 Ma

Scientific classification
- Domain: Eukaryota
- Kingdom: Animalia
- Phylum: Chordata
- Class: Mammalia
- Order: †Notoungulata
- Family: †Homalodotheriidae
- Genus: †Asmodeus; Ameghino 1894

Type species
- †Asmodeus osborni Ameghino, 1894

Species
- A. osborni Ameghino 1894; A. petrasnerus Seoane & Cerdeño 2014; A. scotti Ameghino 1894

Extinct genus of mammals

Asmodeus is an extinct genus of mammal, belonging to the order Notoungulata. It lived during the Late Oligocene, in what is today South America.

== Description ==
This animal was relatively heavy-shaped, with long, strong and slender limbs. Its hand had four fingers, and a reduced fifth metacarpal. The main characteristic of Asmodeus, which shows its affinities with its relative Homalodotherium, is in the shape of its forelimbs, which made the hind legs lower than the forelegs. The front legs were clawed, and not hooved as in most of the known toxodonts. Compared to Homalodotherium, the reduction of the fifth metacarpal was less important in Asmodeus.

== Classification ==
First described in 1894 by Florentino Ameghino, Asmodeus belonged to the family Homalodotheriidae, a group of notoungulates with characteristically elongated and clawed front legs. Two species of Asmodeus are known, including A. osborni, the type species, from the Deseado Formation of Argentine Patagonia, and A. petrasnerus from the Agua de la Piedra Formation in the Mendoza Province of Northern Argentina. The species are mainly distinguished by characteristics of the talus and the calcaneus.

== Bibliography ==
- F. Ameghino. 1894. Sur les oiseaux fossiles de Patagonie; et la faune mammalogique des couches à Pyrotherium. Boletin del Instituto Geographico Argentino 15:501-660
- F. B. Loomis. 1914. The Deseado Formation of Patagonia, pp. 1–232
- Federico Seoane and Esperanza Cerdeño (2014). First extra-Patagonian record of Asmodeus (Notoungulata, Homalodotheriidae) in the Late Oligocene of Mendoza Province, Argentina. Ameghiniana.
