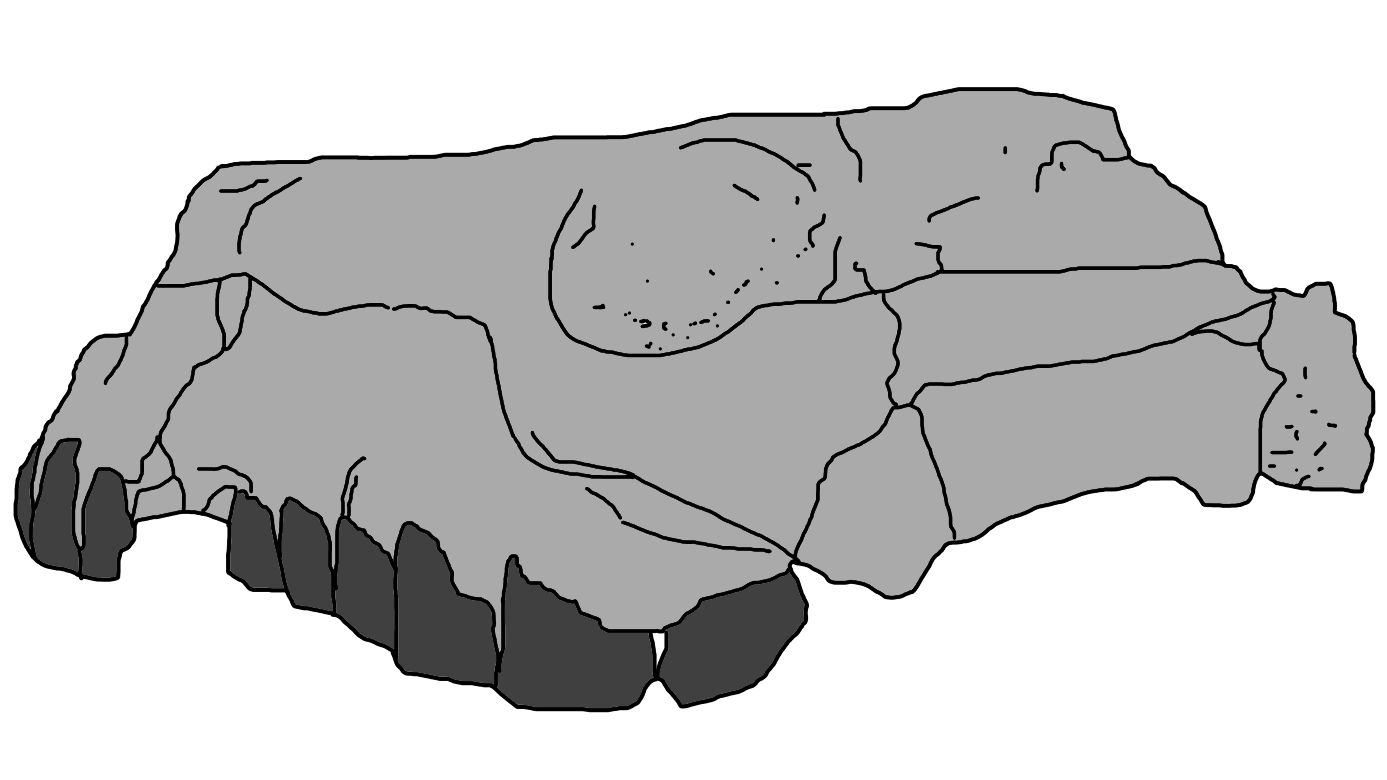
- Skull of Eurygenium latirostris

Scientific classification
- Kingdom: Animalia
- Phylum: Chordata
- Class: Mammalia
- Order: †Notoungulata
- Family: †Notohippidae
- Genus: †Eurygenium; Ameghino 1895

Type species
- †Eurygenium latirostris Ameghino 1895

Species
- E. latirostris Ameghino 1895; E. normalis Ameghino 1897; E. pacegnum Shockey 1997

Synonyms
- Eurygeniops Ameghino 1897

= Eurygenium =

Eurygenium Temporal range: Late Oligocene ~28–24 Ma

Extinct genus of notoungulates

Eurygenium is an extinct genus of notoungulate belonging to the family Notohippidae. It lived during the Late Oligocene in what is today South America.

== Description ==
It was a medium-sized mammal; the best known species, Eurygenium pacegnum, was approximately 80 centimeters long and weighed 10 kilograms. Its body was relatively compact, with more robust legs than its relatives, such as Rhynchippus; unlike the latter, however, Eurygenium had tetradactyls forelegs and a third trochanter near the femoral midline. The skull of Eurygenium was characterized by a short and broad muzzle, with strong and laterally expanded zygomatic arches. The dentition was devoid of diastema. As in all Notohippidae, premolars and molars had a very high crown (hypsodont). The upper premolars lacked an anterolingual cingulum, while the posterolingual cingulum was reduced. The lower incisors cingulum was reduced or absent, while the lower premolars and molars had a dimple at the trigonid-talonid edge, but there was no dimple in the entolophid.

== Classification ==
Eurygenium was a member of Notohippidae, a possibly paraphiletic family of toxodont notoungulates. Eurygenium was a basal representative of a derived group of Notohippids, comprising numerous forms such as Argyrohippus and Rhynchippus.

Eurygenium was first described in 1895 by Florentino Ameghino, based on fossilized remains found in terrains dated from the Late Oligocene in Argentine Patagonia. The type species is Eurygenium latirostris, but Ameghino described himself the species E. normalis, from the Late Oligocene of Patagonia. E. pacegnum was described in 1997, based on relatively well preserved specimens found in the Salla Formation, in Bolivia.
