= Pascualihippus =

Pascualihippus Temporal range: Late Oligocene ~28–25 Ma

Scientific classification
- Kingdom: Animalia
- Phylum: Chordata
- Class: Mammalia
- Order: †Notoungulata
- Family: †Notohippidae
- Genus: †Pascualihippus; Shockey, 1997
- Species: †P. boliviensis

Binomial name
- †Pascualihippus boliviensis Shockey, 1997

Extinct genus of notoungulates

Pascualihippus is an extinct monotypic genus of notoungulate belonging to the family Notohippidae. It lived during the Late Oligocene, in what is now Bolivia.

== Description ==
This genus is primarily known from a skull and a few postcranial bones, and it likely was about the size of a sheep. Pascualihippus had a high skull, with a broad, blunt muzzle, with the two first incisors forming a transverse line across the anterior part of the premaxilla, followed by a narrowing of the muzzle when viewed from above. These characteristics are somewhat similar to those found in Toxodontidae, such as Adinotherium and Nesodon. However, its incisors had roots and the cheek teeth were quite different from those of "true" toxodonts. The molars of Pascualihippus lacked the typical bifurcation on the central loop. The premaxillary dental arch was linear, indicating that it likely was a grass bruiser. Unlike its relative Eomorphippus, its incisors were not protruding.

== Classification ==
Pascualihippus was first described in 1997, based on fossilized remains found in the Salla Formation in Bolivia, in terrains dated from the Late Oligocene. Pascualihippus was originally placed within the family Notohippidae, a family of toxodont notoungulates with horse-like teeth, with very high-crowned molars. More recent research, however, tends to indicate that this group was paraphyletic, containing increasingly derived forms, some of them close to the ancestors of "true" Toxodontidae. Pascualihippus seems to have been close to those forms, and is in more modern studies nested at the basis of a clade including its relative Argyrohippus and more derived Toxodontidae.

== Palaeobiology ==
=== Palaeoecology ===
Because Pascualhippus molars were hypsodont, scoring 1.5 on the hypsodonty index, and its incisor series was broad and transversely linear, Pascualhippus is concluded to have been a grazer.
