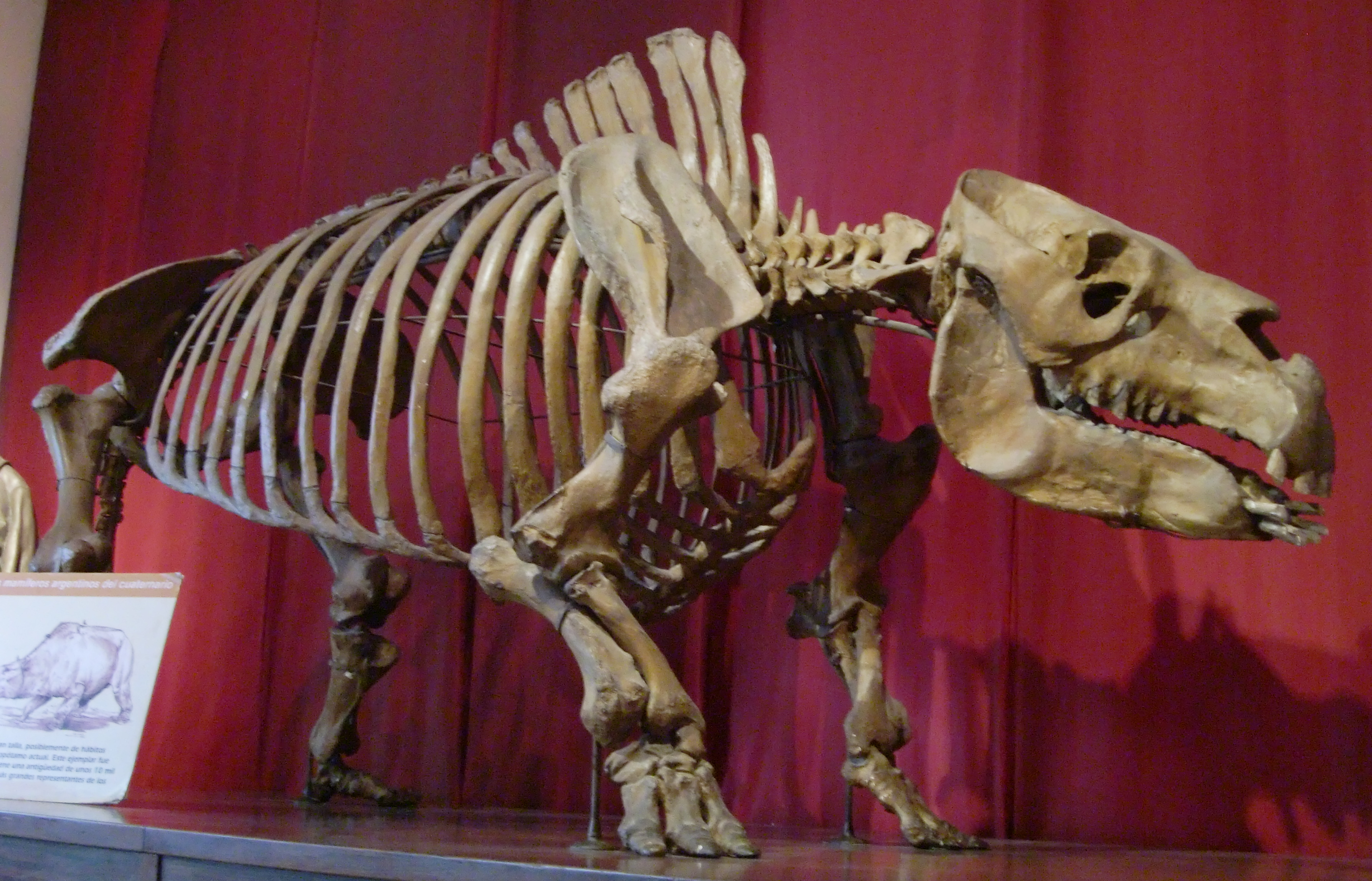
- Skeleton of Toxodon, a large rhinoceros-sized member of Toxodontidae (Toxodontia)
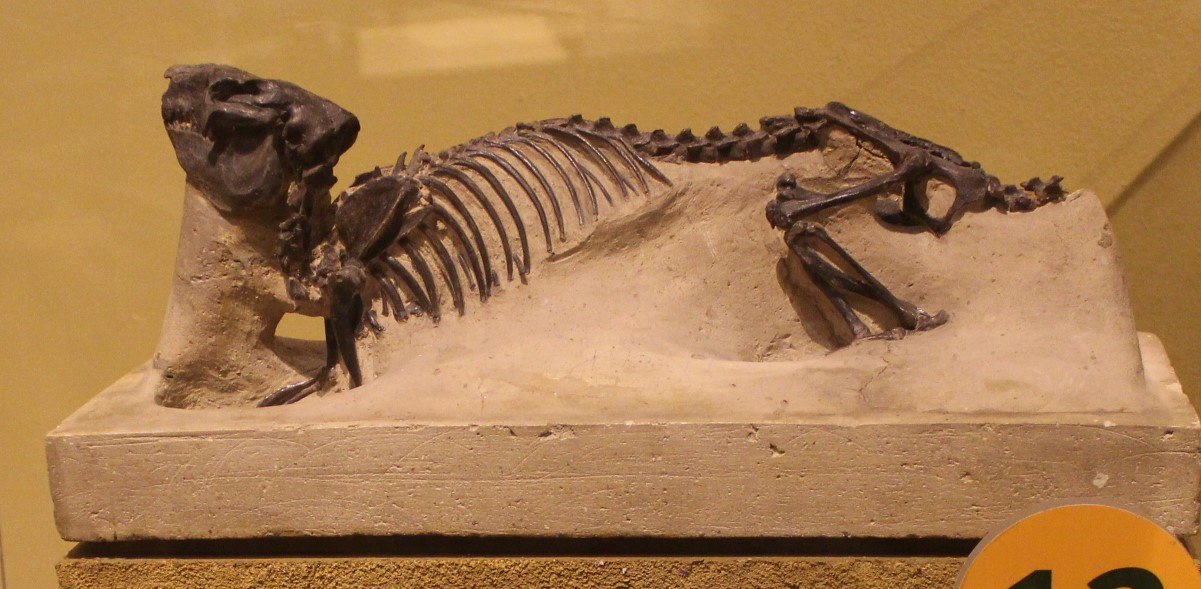
- Skeleton of Interatherium, a mink-sized member of Interatheriidae (Typotheria)

Scientific classification
- Kingdom: Animalia
- Phylum: Chordata
- Class: Mammalia
- Clade: Panperissodactyla
- Order: †Notoungulata; Roth 1903

Subgroups
- Notioprogonia (paraphyletic?); Toxodontia; Typotheria

= Notoungulata =

Notoungulata Temporal range: early Paleocene (Danian)-Late Pleistocene ~61–0.012 Ma

Extinct order of hoofed mammals

Notoungulata is an extinct order of ungulates that inhabited South America from the early Paleocene to the end of the Pleistocene, living from approximately 61 million to 11,000 years ago. Notoungulates were morphologically diverse, with forms resembling animals as disparate as rabbits and rhinoceroses. Notoungulata are the largest group of South American native ungulates, with over 150 genera in 14 families having been described, divided into two major subgroupings, Typotheria and Toxodontia. Notoungulates first diversified during the Eocene. Their diversity declined from the late Neogene onwards, with only the large toxodontids persisting until the end of the Pleistocene (with Mixotoxodon expanding into Central America and southern North America), perishing as part of the Late Pleistocene megafauna extinctions along with most other large mammals across the Americas. Collagen sequence analysis suggests that notoungulates are closely related to litopterns, another group of South American ungulates, and their closest living relatives being perissodactyls (odd-toed ungulates), including rhinoceroses, tapirs and equines as part of the clade Panperissodactyla. However their relationships to other South American ungulates are uncertain. Several groups of notoungulates separately evolved ever-growing cheek teeth.

== Taxonomy ==
Notoungulata is divided into two major suborders, Typotheria and Toxodontia, alongside some basal groups (Notostylopidae and Henricosborniidae) which are potentially paraphyletic. Notoungulates make up over half the described diversity of indigenous South American ungulates, with over 150 genera in 14 different families.

This order is proposed to be united with other South American native ungulates in the super-order Meridiungulata. The notoungulate and litoptern native ungulates of South America have been shown by studies of collagen and mitochondrial DNA sequences to be a sister group to the perissodactyls, making them true ungulates. The estimated divergence date is 66 million years ago. This conflicts with the results of some morphological analyses which posited them as afrotherians. It is in line with some more recent morphological analyses which suggested they were basal euungulates. Panperissodactyla has been proposed as the name of an unranked clade to include perissodactyls and their extinct South American ungulate relatives.

Cifelli has argued that Notioprogonia is paraphyletic, as it would include the ancestors of the remaining suborders. Similarly, Cifelli indicated that Typotheria would be paraphyletic if it excluded Hegetotheria and he advocated inclusion of Archaeohyracidae and Hegetotheriidae in Typotheria.

Notoungulata were for many years taken to include the order Arctostylopida, whose fossils are found mainly in China. Recent studies, however, have concluded that Arctostylopida are more properly classified as gliriforms, and that the notoungulates were therefore never found outside South and Central America.

Based on an analysis of 133 morphological characters in 50 notoungulate genera, Billet in 2011 concluded that Homalodotheriidae, Leontiniidae, Toxodontidae, Interatheriidae, Mesotheriidae, and Hegetotheriidae are the only monophyletic families of notoungulates. Some studies have suggested that Pyrotheria, often ranked as an independent order, should also be included within Notoungulata.

=== Phylogeny ===
- Notoungulata
  - Henricosbornia
  - - Simpsonotus
    - - Notostylops
      - Pyrotherium
    - - Toxodontia
        - - - Pampahippus
            - Rhyphodon
          - - Thomashuxleya
            - Periphragnis
        - - Pleurostylodon
          - - Homalodotheriidae
              - Asmodeus
              - Homalodotherium
            - Leontiniidae
              - Colpodon
              - Ancylocoelus
              - - Leontinia
                - Scarrittia
            - Eomorphippus
            - Eurygenium
            - Rhynchippus
            - Morphippus
            - - Pascualihippus
              - - Argyrohippus
                - Toxodontidae
                  - Nesodon
                  - Adinotherium
                  - - Posnanskytherium
                    - Hoffstetterius
                    - Toxodon
      - Typotheria
        - Colbertia
        - Oldfieldthomasia
        - Campanorco
        - Acropithecus
        - Ultrapithecus
        - Interatheriidae
          - Notopithecus
          - - Federicoanaya
            - Protypotherium
            - Miocochilius
            - - Archaeophylus
              - - Plagiarthrus
                - - Interatherium
                  - Cochilius
        - - Eohyrax
          - - Pseudhyrax
            - - Mesotheriidae
                - - Plesiotypotherium
                  - Mesotherium
                - Trachytherus
              - Archaeotypotherium
              - Archaeohyrax
              - Hegetotheriidae
                - - Prohegetotherium
                  - Hegetotherium
                - - Prosotherium
                  - Paedotherium

=== Classification ===
- Suborder Notioprogonia (probably paraphyletic)
  - Family Henricosborniidae
  - Family Notostylopidae
- Suborder Toxodontia
  - Family Isotemnidae
  - Family Leontiniidae
  - Family Notohippidae (paraphyletic)
  - Family Toxodontidae
  - Family Homalodotheriidae
- Suborder Typotheria
  - Family Archaeohyracidae
  - Family Archaeopithecidae
  - Family Campanorcidae
  - Family Hegetotheriidae
  - Family Interatheriidae
  - Family Mesotheriidae
  - Family Oldfieldthomasiidae

== Description and ecology ==
Notoungulates are united by a number of morphological characters of the skull, including a large epitympanic sinus (part of the inner ear) within the squamosal bone, as well as a "crochet" on the metaloph (a raised crest present on mammal teeth) of the upper molars. Notoungulates varied widely in body size, with early diverging notoungulates like Simpsonotus, and some hegetotheriid and interatheriid typotherians having a body mass of approximately 1–2 kilograms (2.2–4.4 lb), while the toxodontid Toxodon is suggested to have had a body mass exceeding 1,000 kilograms (2,200 lb). Typotheres generally occupied small-medium body size niches, while toxodontians were generally medium-large sized animals.

The families Interatheriidae, Hegetotheriidae, Mesotheriidae and Toxodontidae separately evolved high crowned (hypsodont) ever-growing (hypeselodont) cheek teeth, with high crowned species constituting the majority of notoungulates from the Late Oligocene onward. This adaptation was historically suggested to be the result of a diet increasingly incorporating grass, but this has been questioned, and other authors suggesting that it may have been due to the increasing intake of abrasive particles from volcanic sources.

Many typotheres have bodyforms convergent on rodents, hyraxes and rabbits, with some rabbit-like hegetotheriids suggested to have developed a rabbit-like bounding locomotion. The basal notungulate Notostylops and the mesotheriids are suggested to have engaged in digging, with mesotheriids suggested to have had an ecology similar to wombats. Toxodontids have sometimes been compared to rhinoceroses and hippopotamuses in overall bodyform and tooth morphology. The Miocene toxodontian Homalodotherium had claws on its forelimbs and is thought to have had an ecology similar to the extinct chalicotheres, rearing on its hindlegs to feed. Like perissodactyls, notoungulates were likely primitively hindgut fermenters, but it has also been proposed that some of them may have had fermentation more similar to ruminants based on their skeletal anatomy, though this is uncertain.

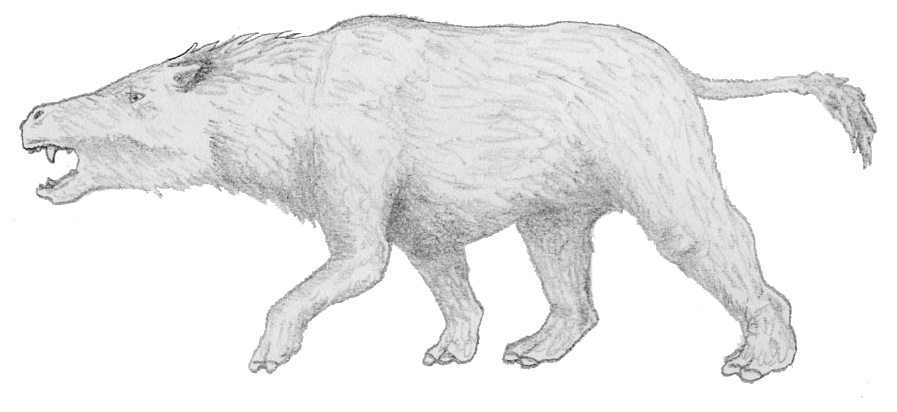
Restoration of Thomashuxleya, an early toxodontian notoungulate from the Eocene (Lutetian) of Argentina

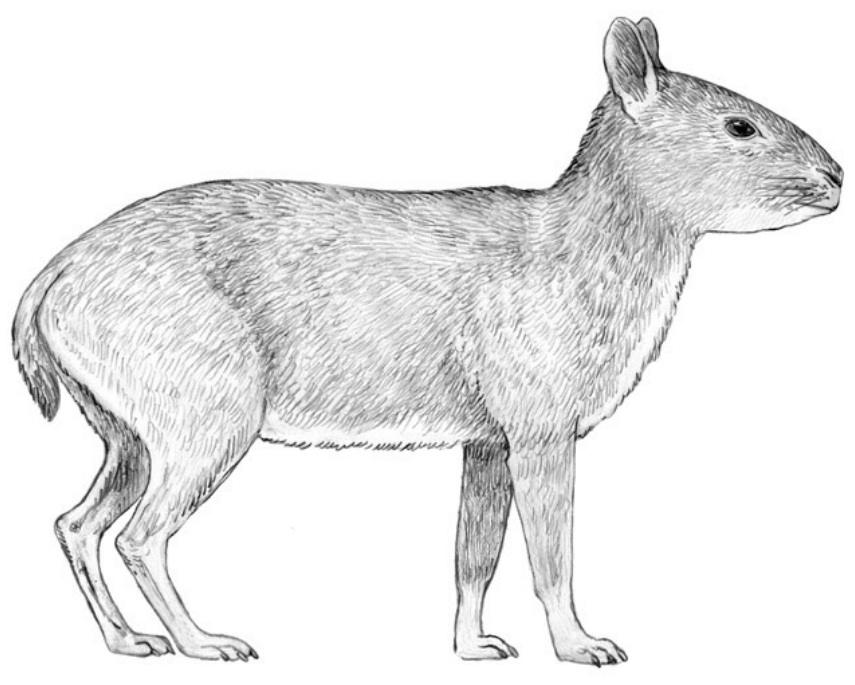
Life restoration of Hegetotherium (Typotheria, Hegetotheriidae)

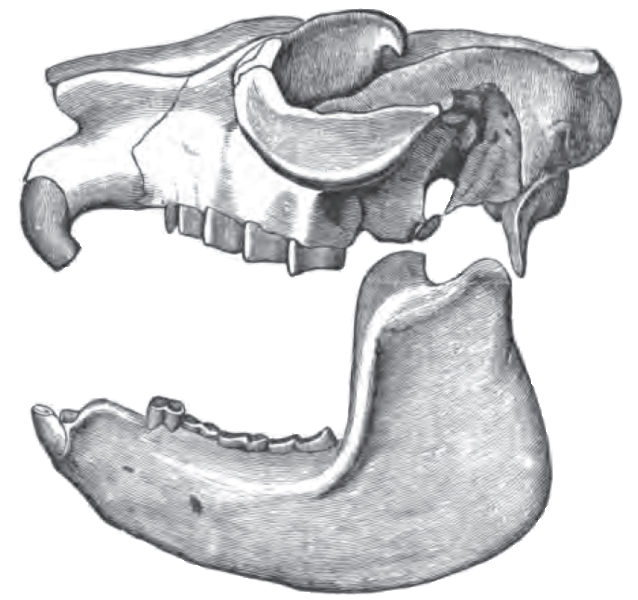
Skull of Mesotherium (Typotheria, Mesotheriidae)

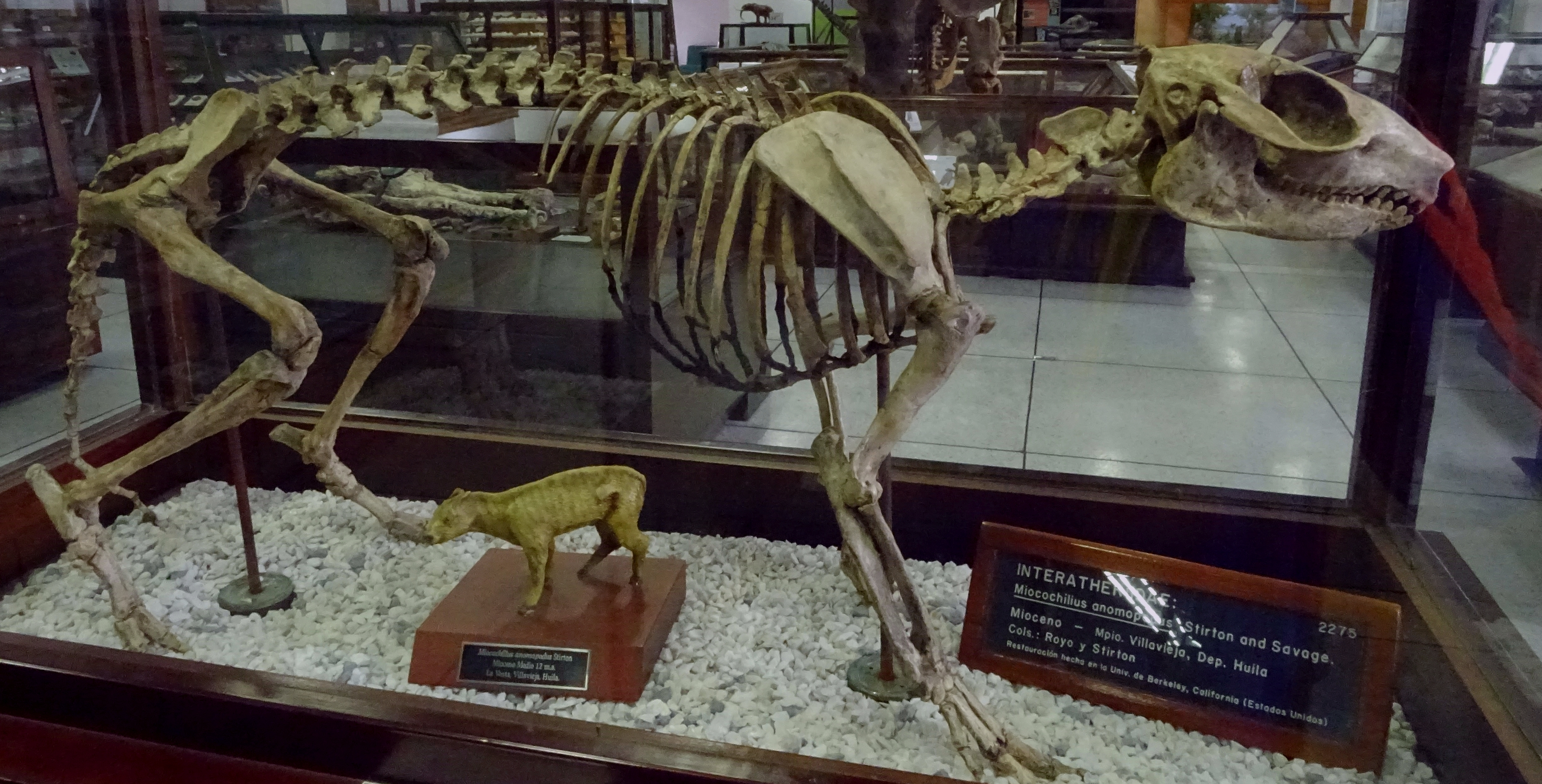
Skeleton of Miocochilius (Typotheria, Interatheriidae)

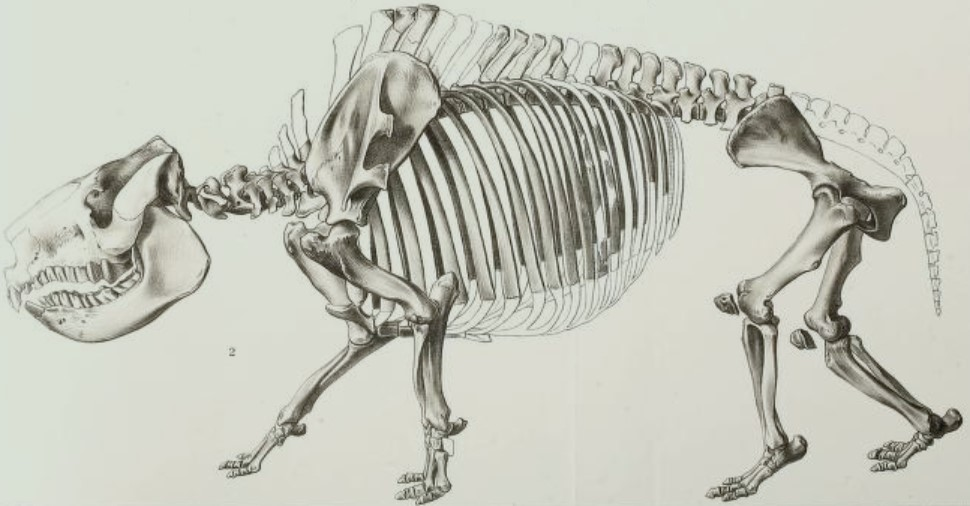
Skeleton of Nesodon (Toxodontia, Toxodontidae)

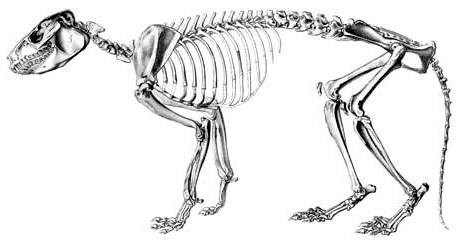
Skeleton of Protypotherium (Typotheria, Interatheriidae)

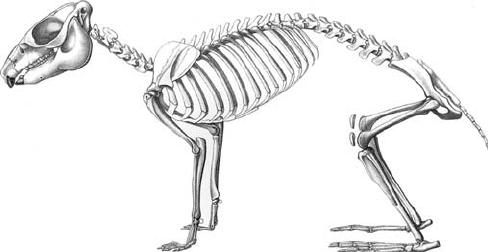
Skeleton of Pachyrukhos (Typotheria, Hegetotheriidae)

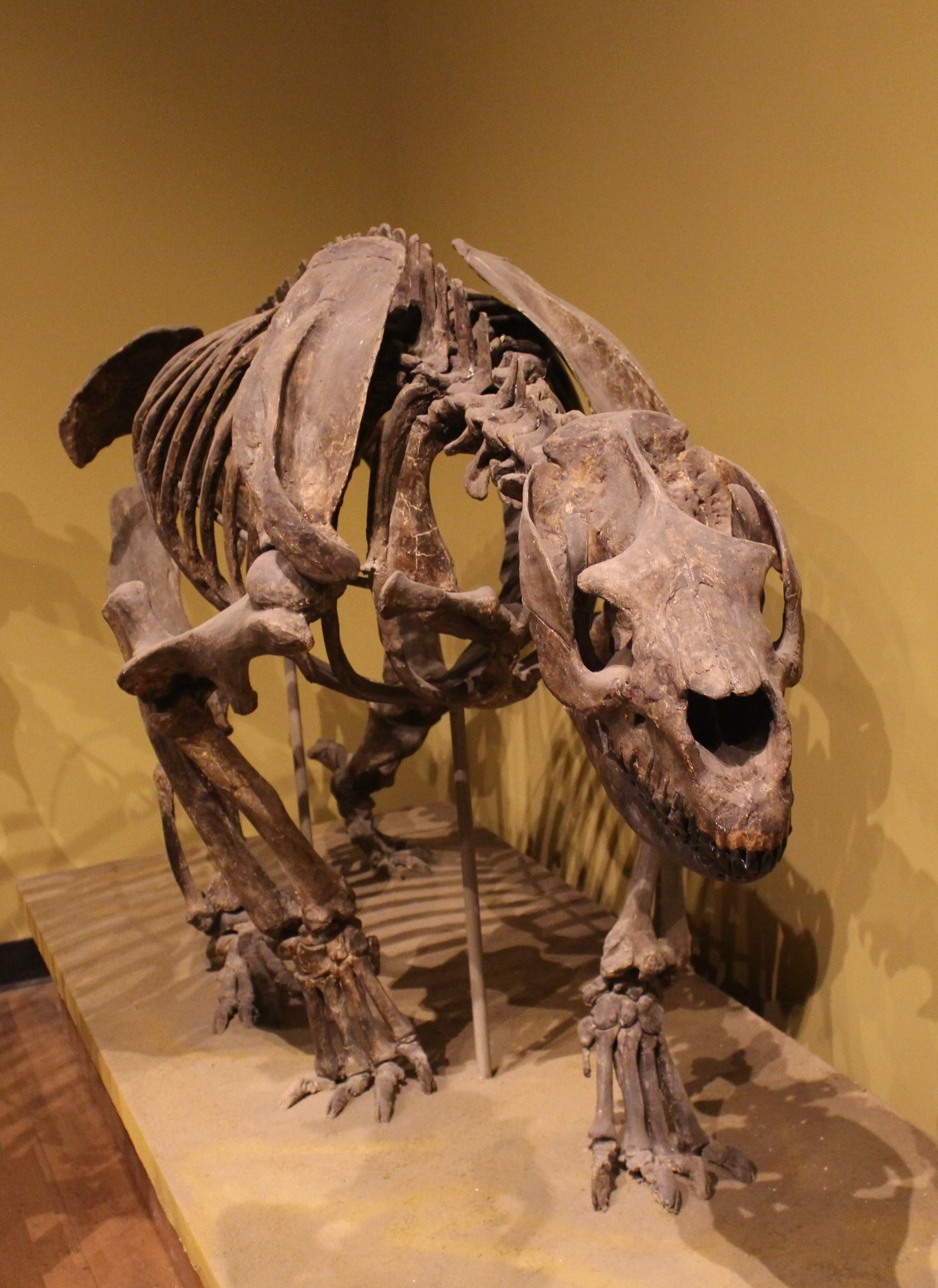
Skeleton of Homalodotherium (Toxodontia, Homalodotheriidae)

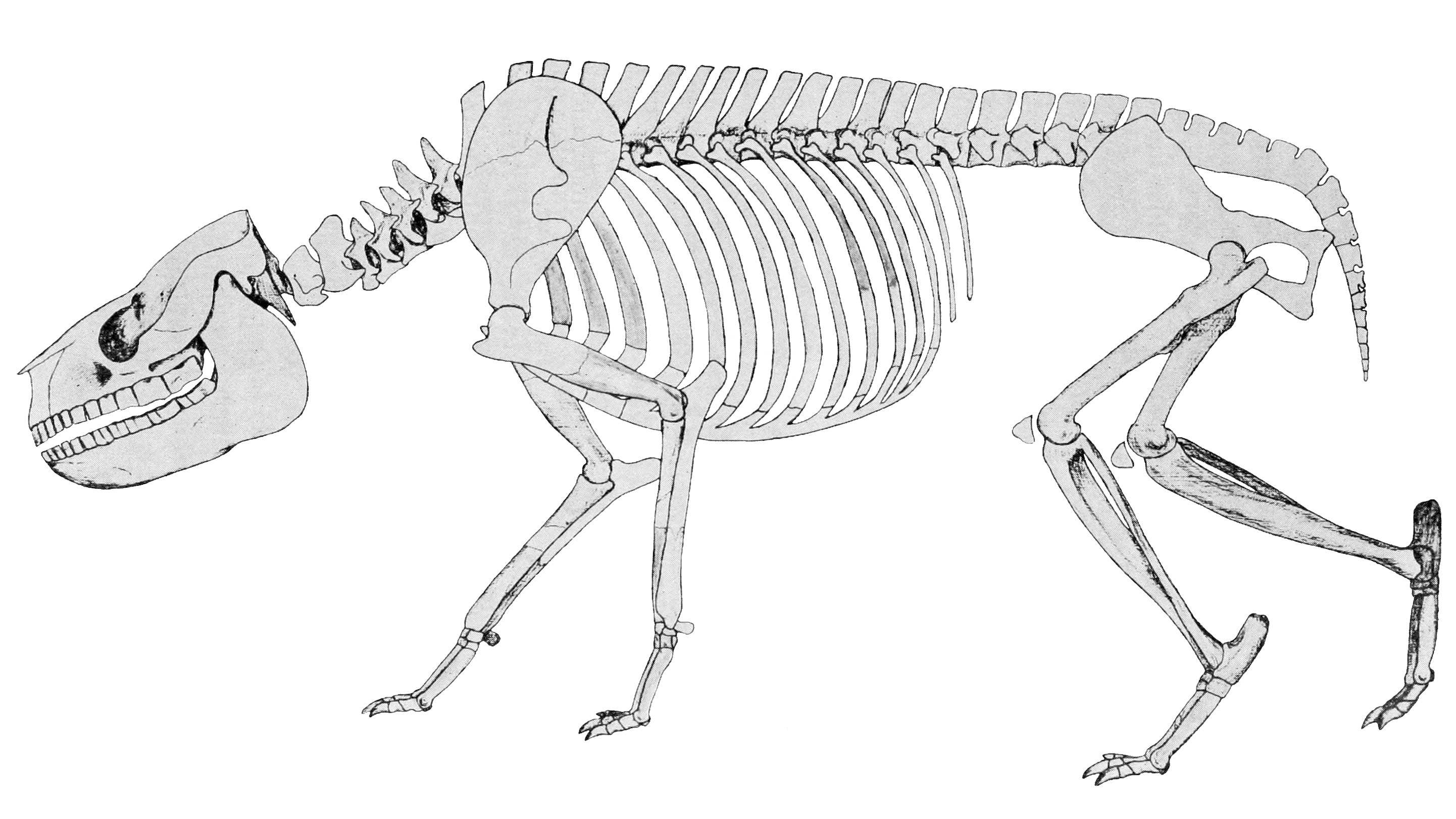
Rhynchippus (Toxodontia, Notohippidae)

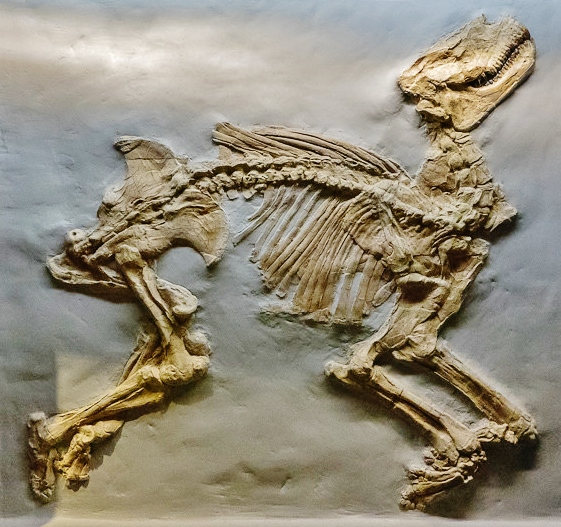
Scarrittia (Toxodontia, Leontiniidae)

== Evolutionary history ==
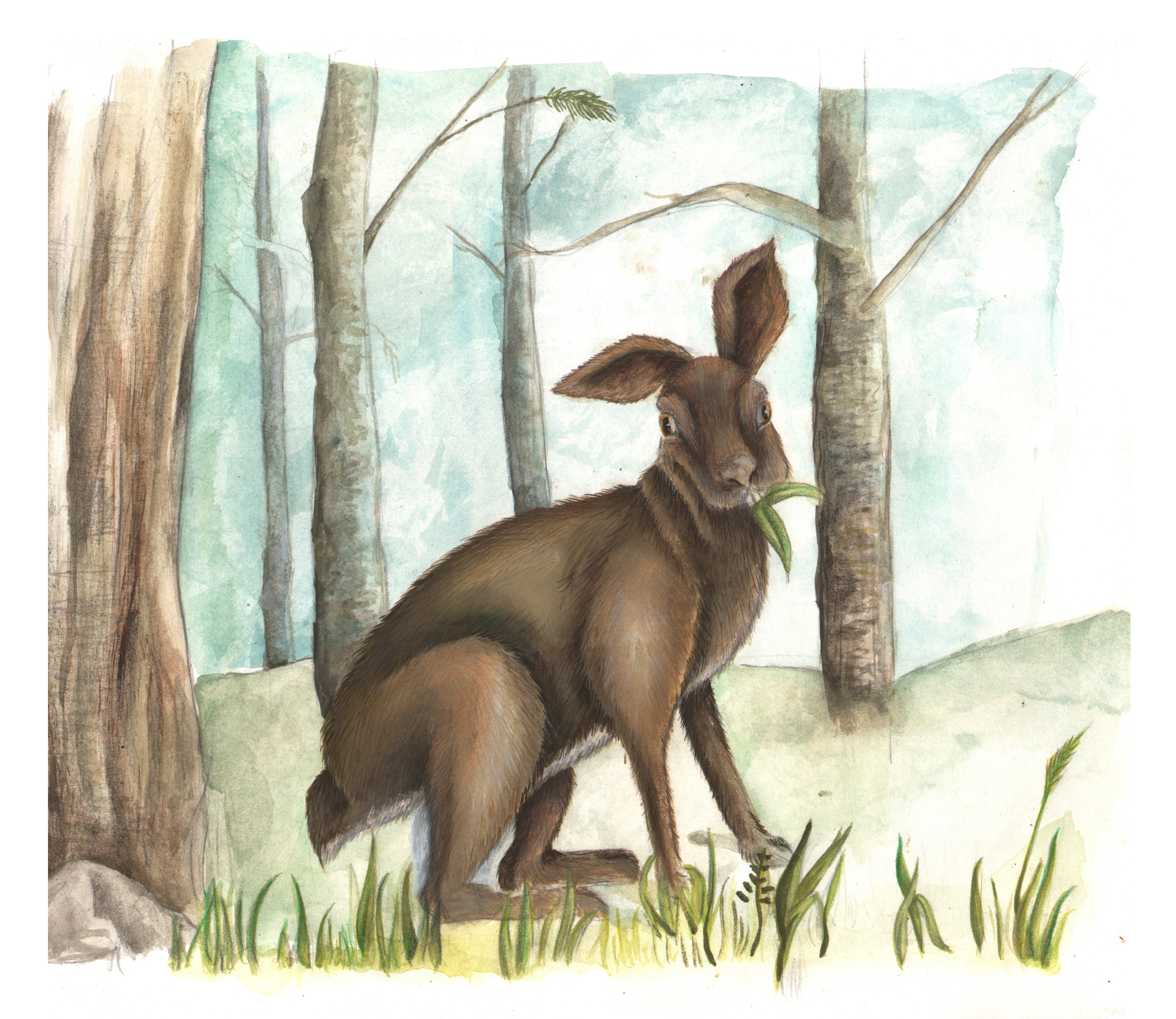
Life restoration of Pachyrukhos, a Miocene aged rabbit-like hegetotheriid

The oldest notoungulates appeared during the Paleocene, probably originating from "condylarth" ancestors that had migrated from North America. Notoungulates and other South American native ungulates reached their apex of diversity during the Eocene and Oligocene. Notoungulate species diversity was stable during the Miocene, though 45% of the family diversity of the group became extinct during the interval, including Homalodotheriidae, Leontiniidae, and Interatheriidae. The diversity of the group declined during the Pliocene and Pleistocene, which is coeval in time with the Great American Interchange, which allowed ungulates and other mammals from North America to enter South America. This decline has historically been attributed to competition with the new North American arrivals, though earlier views had probably overstated the importance of this, with climatic change also likely being an important factor. As part of the Great American interchange, the toxodontid Mixotoxodon migrated into Central and North America, with its furthest northern record being in Texas. The last hegetotheriids are known from the Early Pleistocene (with a supposed Middle Pleistocene record being considered questionable). The youngest known member of Typotheria, the mesotheriid Mesotherium, has its last records in the late Middle Pleistocene, around 220,000 years ago. The last notoungulates, the toxodontids Toxodon, Mixotoxodon and Piauhytherium became extinct at the end of the Late Pleistocene around 12,000 years ago as part of the Late Pleistocene megafauna extinctions, along with most other large mammals in the Americas. The extinctions followed the arrival of the first humans to the Americas and they have been suggested to have been a potential causal factor in the extinctions.
