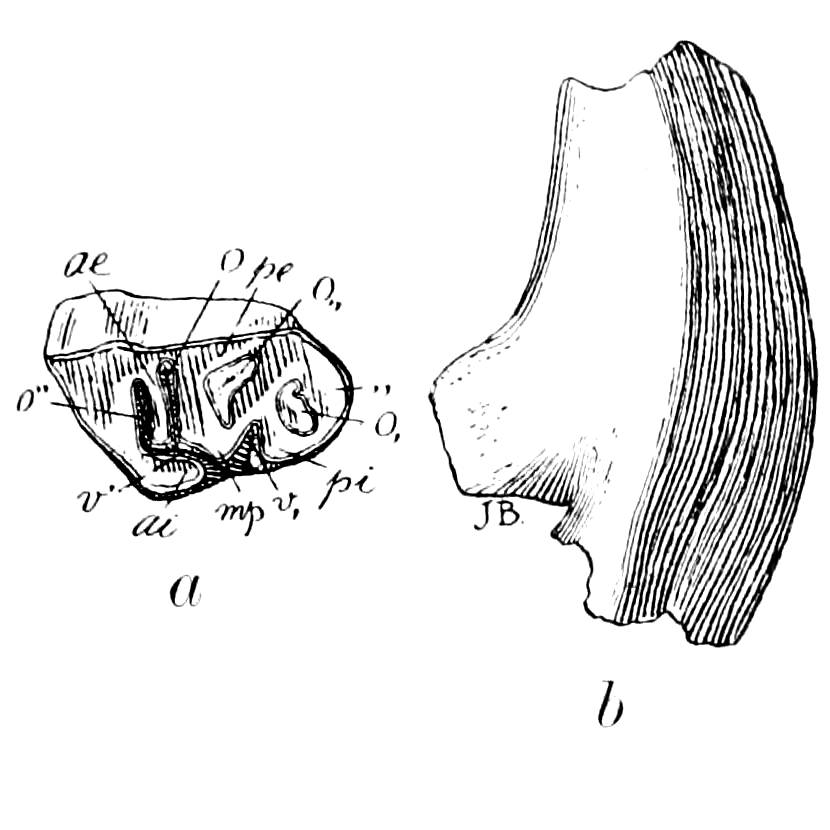
- Argyrohippus fraterculus

Scientific classification
- Domain: Eukaryota
- Kingdom: Animalia
- Phylum: Chordata
- Class: Mammalia
- Order: †Notoungulata
- Family: †Notohippidae
- Genus: †Argyrohippus; Ameghino 1902

Type species
- †Argyrohippus fraterculus Ameghino, 1902

Species
- A. boulei Ameghino 1902; A. fraterculus Ameghino 1902; A. praecox Partterson 1935

= Argyrohippus =

Argyrohippus Temporal range: Late Oligocene-Early Miocene ~23–17.5 Ma

Extinct genus of mammals

Argyrohippus is an extinct genus of notoungulate, belonging to the family Notohippidae. It lived from the Late Oligocene to the Early Miocene, and its fossilized remains were found in South America.

== Description ==
This animal was probably vaguely similar in build and size to a goat. It is mostly known from remains of its dentition, which was very specialized : the dentition was complete and continuous (without diastema), but the premolars and molars were hypsodonts. The canines were small. The premolars had a very developed cingulum, while the molars were quite elongated. The shape of the premolars and molar was very reminiscent of those of Equidae. Its most peculiar distinctive characteristics were the cup-shaped internal cingula and the lack of singula on the premolars, and a thick layer of cementum.

== Classification ==
The genus Argyrohippus (whose name means "Argentine horse") was first described in 1902 by Florentino Ameghino, based on fossil remains found in Early Miocene deposits in Argentina. The type species is Argyrohippus fraterculus; Ameghino described another species, A. boulei, mainly differentiated from the type species by some dental characteristics, like its more protruding incisors, and by its greater size. In 1935, a new species was described by Bryan Patterson, A. praecox, from the Late Oligocene of Argentina, with more brachydont teeth.

Argyrohippus has historically been classified as a member of Notohippidae, a group of notoungulates with teeth similar to those of horses. However, this family is now considered paraphyletic, and several forms included in it may in reality be ancestral to the family Toxodontidae. Argyrohippus may be one of those forms.

== Bibliography ==
- F. Ameghino. 1902. Première contribution à la connaissance de la fauna mammalogique des couches à Colpodon [First contribution to the knowledge of the mammalian fauna of the Colopdon Beds]. Boletin de la Academia Nacional de Ciencias de Córdoba 17:71-141
- Patterson, B. 1935. A new Argyrohippus from the Deseado beds of Patagonia. Fieldiana, Geology 6:161–166
- G. M. López, A. M. Ribeiro, and M. Bond. 2010. The Notohippidae (Mammalia, Notoungulata) from Gran Barranca: preliminary considerations. In R. H. Madden, A. A. Carlini, M. G. Vucetich, R. F. Kay (eds.), The Paleontology of Gran Barranca: Evolution and Environmental Change through the Middle Cenozoic of Patagonia 143–151
