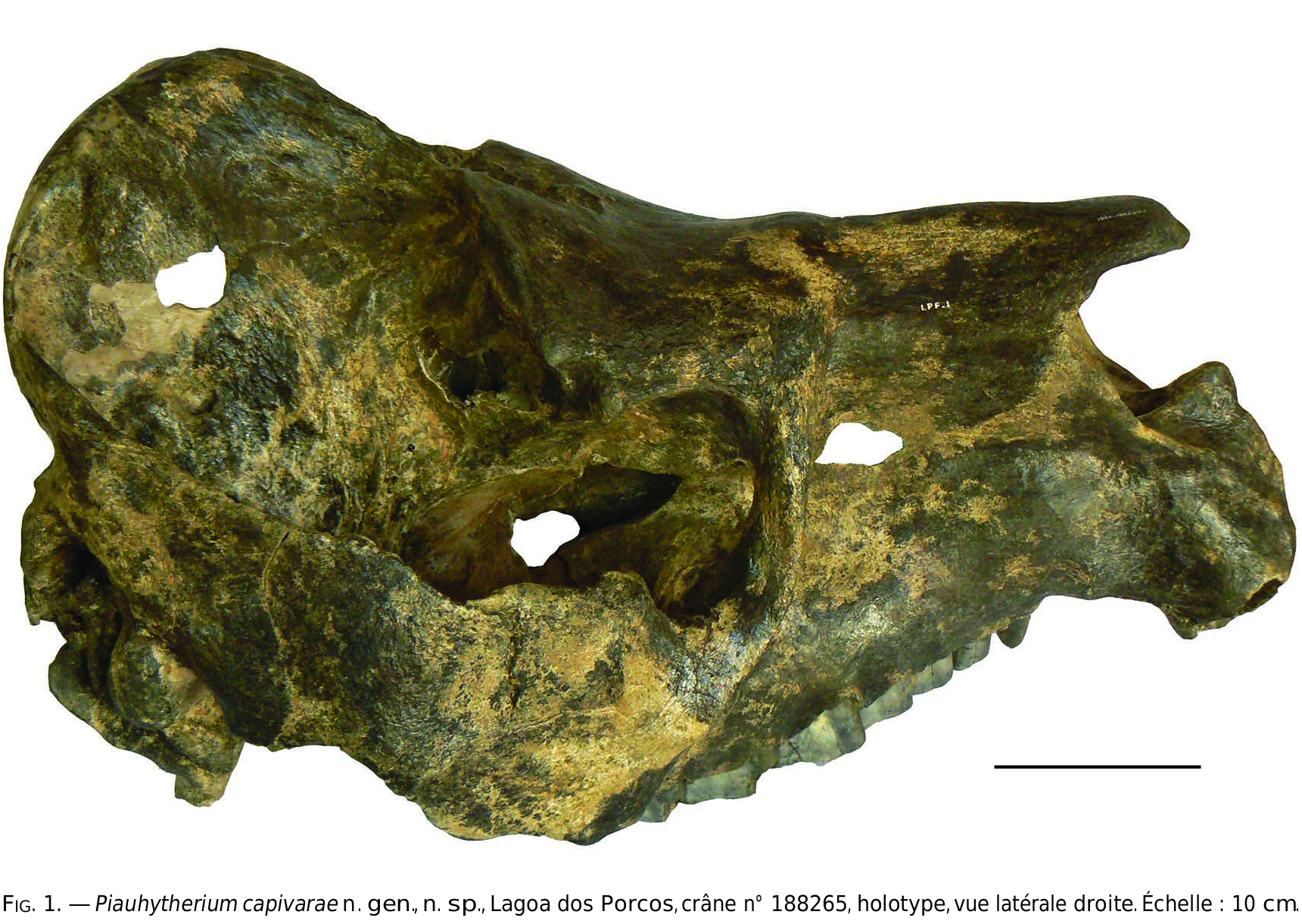
- Skull

Scientific classification
- Kingdom: Animalia
- Phylum: Chordata
- Class: Mammalia
- Order: †Notoungulata
- Family: †Toxodontidae
- Subfamily: †Toxodontinae
- Genus: †Piauhytherium; Guérin & Faure 2013
- Species: †P. capivarae

Binomial name
- †Piauhytherium capivarae Guérin & Faure 2013

= Piauhytherium =

Piauhytherium Temporal range: Late Pleistocene (Lujanian) ~0.010 Ma

Extinct genus of mammals

Piauhytherium is an extinct genus of herbivorous notoungulate mammal of the family Toxodontidae. It lived during the Late Pleistocene; fossils have been found in Brazil. The only known species is Piauhytherium capivarae. The validity of the genus and species is controversial, with it being suggested by a number of authors that the species is a junior synonym of the previously named Trigodonops.

== Description ==
This animal in general terms resembles a hippopotamus, with a big short snout, a massive body and a large head. The skull measured almost 60 centimetres (24 in) in length, which indicates that Piauhytherium could be as big as a modern black rhinoceros. With regard to its nearest relatives, such as Toxodon, this animal's legs were shorter and thicker, in addition, certain differences in the denture distinguish it from other notoungulates of this period.

== Classification ==
Piauhytherium capivarae was described for the first time in 2013, based on a complete skull including a jaw and some postcranial bones found in Serra da Capivara in Piauí, in northeastern Brazil. This animal belonged to a group of notoungulates known as Toxodonta, which comprises numerous herbivores from the Cenozoic of South America, whose better-known representative is Toxodon. (Some remains found in Brazil have been reassigned to Piauhytherium.) Piauhytherium was very similar to Toxodon, but is differentiated in some features of is leg bones and characteristics of the teeth.

The 2018 study that described Falcontoxodon found Piauhytherium, along with Mixotoxodon, Gyrinodon and Falcontoxodon, to be in the same monophyletic clade within Toxodontinae. Below is a parsimony tree establishing the relationships between the genera of Toxodontidae, as proposed by Carrillo et al, 2018. Some authors have suggested that Piauhytherium is a junior synonym of the previously named species Trigodonops lopesi.

- Toxodontia
  - Pampahippus
  - - - Leontinia
      - - - Scarrittia
          - Rhynchippus
    - - Proadinotherium
      - - Nesodontinae
          - Adinotherium
          - Nesodon
        - Toxodontinae
          - Palyeidodon
          - - Hyperoxotodon
            - - - Piauhytherium
                - - Mixotoxodon
                  - Falcontoxodon
                  - Gyrinodon
              - - - - Andinotoxodon
                    - - Hoffstetterius
                      - Ocnerotherium
                      - - Toxodon
                        - Dinotoxodon
                  - - Nonotherium
                    - Posnanskytherium
                - - - Pisanodon
                    - - Pericotoxodon
                      - - Trigodon
                        - Paratrigodon
                  - - Calchaquitherium
                    - Xotodon

== Paleobiology ==
The limb bones, which are particularly short and massive, led the authors of the original scientific description to hypothesise that P. capivarae led a semiaquatic lifestyle, similar to that of modern hippopotamus. This hypothesis had already been previously proposed for other toxodontids (including Toxodon), but equally has been refuted by other studies. The discovery of Piauhytherium is remarkable since it increases the degree of diversity of the toxodontids in the final stages of their evolutionary history: in the Upper Pleistocene only Toxodon, Trigodonops and Mixotoxodon were also known.

== Paleoecology ==
Large, mesoherbivorous mammals in the BIR were widespread and diverse, including the other toxodont Toxodon platensis, the macraucheniid litoptern Xenorhinotherium and equids such as Hippidion principale and Equus neogaeus. Toxodontids were large mixed feeders as well and lived in forested areas, while the equids were nearly entirely grazers. Xenarthran fossils are present in the area as well from several different families, like the giant megatheriid ground sloth Eremotherium, the fellow scelidotheriid Valgipes, the mylodontids Glossotherium, Ocnotherium, and Mylodonopsis. Smaller ground sloths such as the megalonychids Ahytherium and Australonyx and the nothrotheriid Nothrotherium have also been found in the area. Eremotherium was a generalist, while Nothrotherium was a specialist for trees in low density forests, and Valgipes was an intermediate of the two that lived in arboreal savannahs. Glyptodonts and cingulates like the grazing glyptodonts Glyptotherium and Panochthus and the omnivorous pampatheres Pampatherium and Holmesina were present in the open grasslands. A proboscidean species has also been found in the BIR, Notiomastodon platensis, which was also present and was a mixed grazer on the open grasslands. Carnivores included some of the largest known mammalian land carnivores, like the giant felid Smilodon populator and the bear Arctotherium wingei. Several extant taxa are also known from the BIR, like guanacos, giant anteaters, collared peccaries, and striped hog-nosed skunks. Two crab-eating types of extant mammals are also known from the BIR, the crab-eating raccoon and the crab-eating fox, indicating that crabs were also present in the region. The environment of the BIR is unclear, as there were both several species that were grazers, but the precede of the arboreal fossil monkeys Protopithecus and Caipora in the area causes confusion over the area's paleoenvironment. Most of Brazil was thought to have been covered in open tropical cerrado vegetation during the Late Pleistocene, but if Protopithecus and Caipora were arboreal, their presence suggests that the region may have supported a dense closed forest during the Late Pleistocene. It is possible that the region alternated between dry open savannah and closed wet forest throughout the climate change of the Late Pleistocene.
