= Falcontoxodon =

Falcontoxodon Temporal range: Late Pliocene-Pleistocene (Chapadmalalan-Ensenadan) ~3.6–0.78 Ma

Scientific classification
- Kingdom: Animalia
- Phylum: Chordata
- Class: Mammalia
- Order: †Notoungulata
- Family: †Toxodontidae
- Genus: †Falcontoxodon; Carrillo et al, 2018
- Species: †F. aguilerai

Binomial name
- †Falcontoxodon aguilerai Carrillo et al, 2018

Monotypic genus of extinct mammals from Venezuela

Falcontoxodon is an extinct genus of toxodontid notoungulate that lived from the late Pliocene to the Pleistocene in what is now Venezuela. Fossils of this genus have been found in the Chapadmalalan-Uquian Codore Formation, as well as in the more recent Ensenadan San Gregorio Formation.

== Description ==
The genus Falcontoxodon was described in 2018 by Carrillo et al with AMU-CURS 765, an almost complete skull with a well-preserved dentition found in the Algodones Member of the Codore Formation. In the same article, two other specimens assigned to Falcontoxodon were described from the Vergel Member of the San Gregorio Formation, assigned respectively to Falcontoxodon aff. aguilerai and Falcontoxodon sp. In 2021, an analysis of the San Gregorio Formation by Carrillo-Briceño et al uncovered thirty-three additional remains, mostly teeth, that were assigned to the genus.

The name of the genus, Falcontoxodon, refers to its relative, Toxodon, and to the Venezuelan state of Falcón in Northern Venezuela, where the holotype remains have been found. The species' name, aguillerai, honours the Venezuelan paleontologist Orangel Aguilera.

Falcontoxodon was a medium-sized Toxodontinae, estimated to have weighted around 800 kg, roughly half the weight of Toxodon. It had a pear-shaped, 55 cm long skull in frontal view, with an elongated nasal. The third upper incisor was absent and the canine was reduced. The lower molars were hypsodont, and the second lower incisor was developed like a tusk.

== Phylogeny ==
The 2018 study that described Falcontoxodon recovers it, along with Mixotoxodon, Gyrinodon and Piauhytherium, to be in the same monophyletic clade within the subfamily Toxodontinae. Below is a parsimony tree establishing the relationships between the genera of Toxodontidae, as proposed by Carrillo et al, 2018.

- Toxodontia
  - Pampahippus
  - - - Leontinia
      - - - Scarrittia
          - Rhynchippus
    - - Proadinotherium
      - - Nesodontinae
          - Adinotherium
          - Nesodon
        - Toxodontinae
          - Palyeidodon
          - - Hyperoxotodon
            - - - Piauhytherium
                - - Mixotoxodon
                  - Falcontoxodon
                  - Gyrinodon
              - - - - Andinotoxodon
                    - - Hoffstetterius
                      - Ocnerotherium
                      - - Toxodon
                        - Dinotoxodon
                  - - Nonotherium
                    - Posnanskytherium
                - - - Pisanodon
                    - - Pericotoxodon
                      - - Trigodon
                        - Paratrigodon
                  - - Calchaquitherium
                    - Xotodon

== Palaeoecology ==
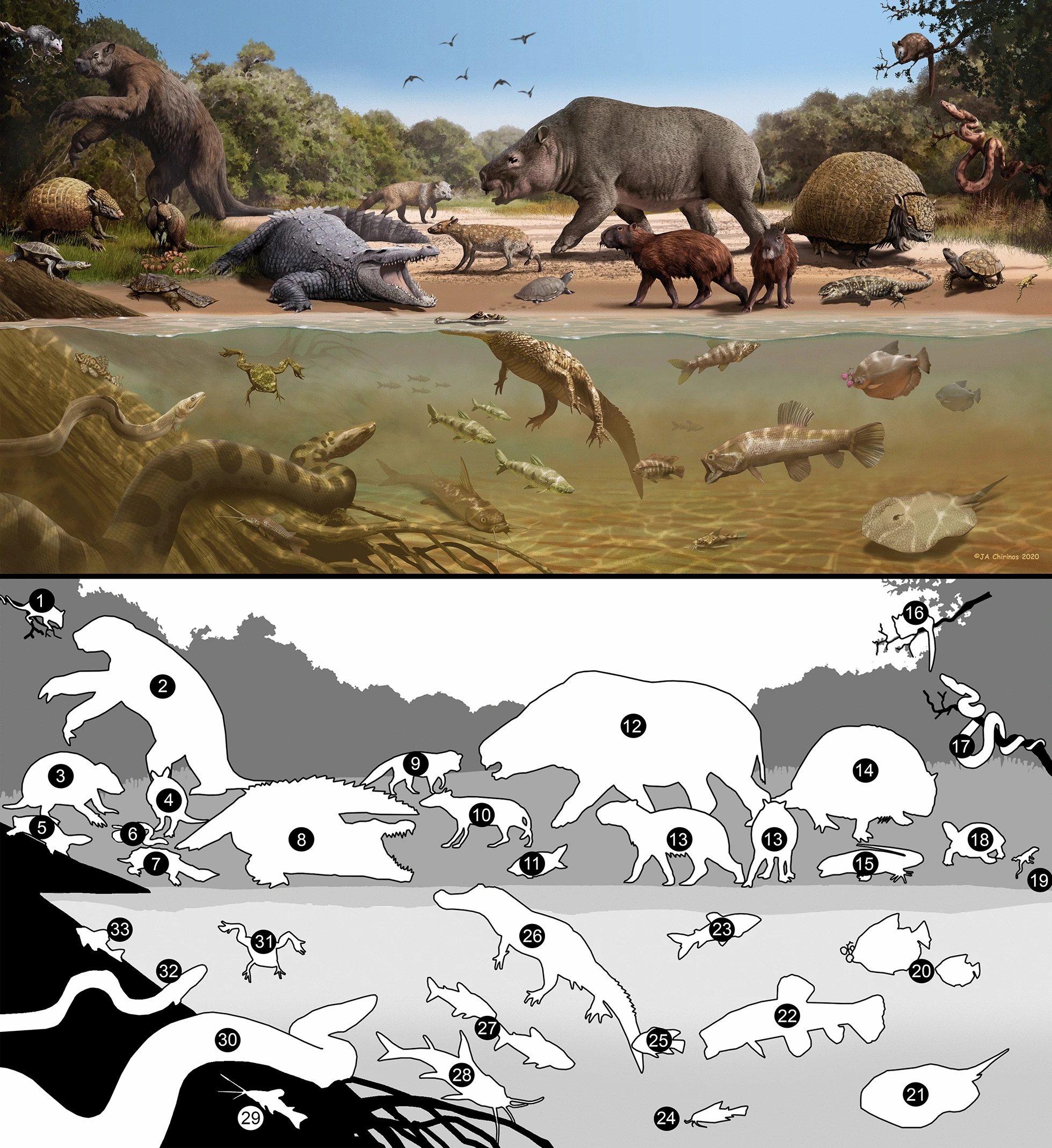
Paleofauna of the San Gregorio Formation, Falcontoxodon at (12)

Falcontoxodon lived in a tropical environment in an area of northern South America that was left relatively untouched by the Great American Interchange, the only non-native species of mammal known in the area of the Falcón Basin being the procyonid Cyonasua and Chapalmalania, and, potentially, a Camelidae still unassigned to a specific genus. Its environment was continental, an open, forested grassland area with rainforest elements, near freshwater. It coexisted with pampatheres such as Holmesina and Plaina, proterotheriidae, the glyptodont Boreostemma, the dasypodidae Pliodasypus and the ground sloth Proeremotherium, as well as several species of caviomorph rodents such as Caviodon, Hydrochoeropsis, Marisela and Neoepiblema, and the crocodile Crocodylus falconensis.
