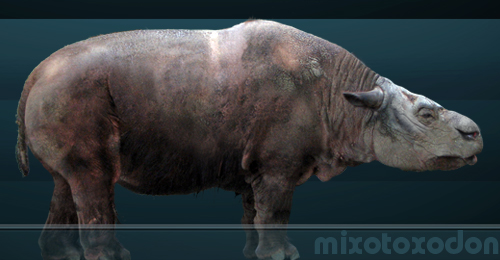
- Life restoration of Mixotoxodon larensis

Scientific classification
- Kingdom: Animalia
- Phylum: Chordata
- Class: Mammalia
- Infraclass: Placentalia
- Order: †Notoungulata
- Family: †Toxodontidae
- Subfamily: †Toxodontinae
- Genus: †Mixotoxodon; Van Frank 1957
- Species: †M. larensis

Binomial name
- †Mixotoxodon larensis Van Frank 1957
- Some locations where Mixotoxodon fossils have been found

= Mixotoxodon =

Mixotoxodon Temporal range: ~1.5–0.012 Ma Pleistocene

Extinct genus of mammals

Mixotoxodon ("mixture Toxodon") is an extinct genus of notoungulate of the family Toxodontidae inhabiting South America, Central America and parts of southern North America during the Pleistocene epoch, from 1,500,000–12,000 years ago.

== Taxonomy ==
Mixotoxodon is known from a single species, M. larensis. The genus was also one of the last surviving notoungulates, along with related genera such as the better-known Toxodon. The name refers to the fact that Mixotoxodon combines characteristics typical of different toxodontid subfamilies.

=== Evolution ===
Mixotodon first appeared in Central America in the Early Pleistocene, with Barranca del Sisimico locality in El Salvador (approx. 1.5 Ma), and the Bajo Barrantes site in Costa Rica, which may be as old as 2 Ma.

== Description ==
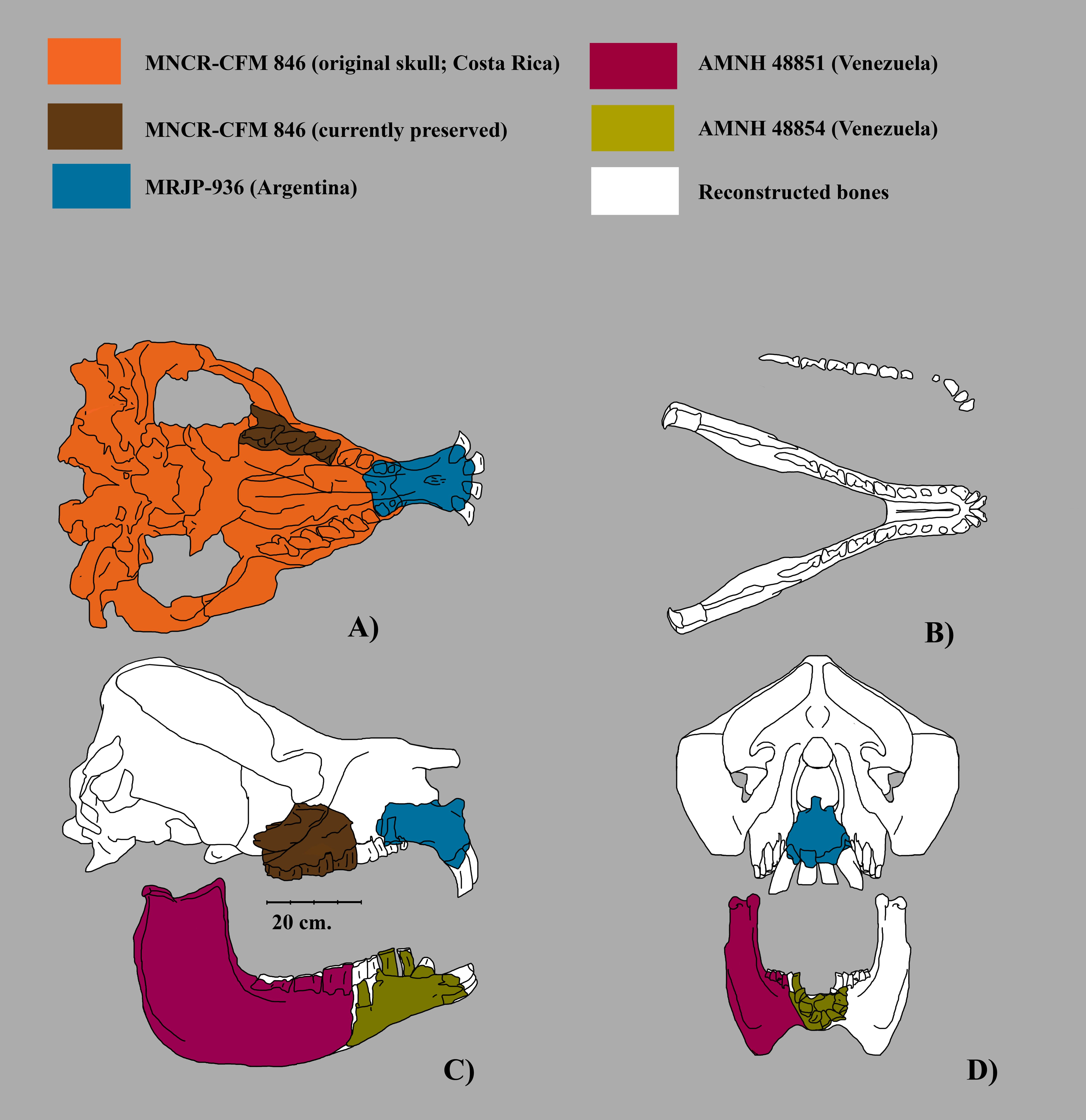
Hypothetical reconstruction of the skull of M. larensis, based in different specimens

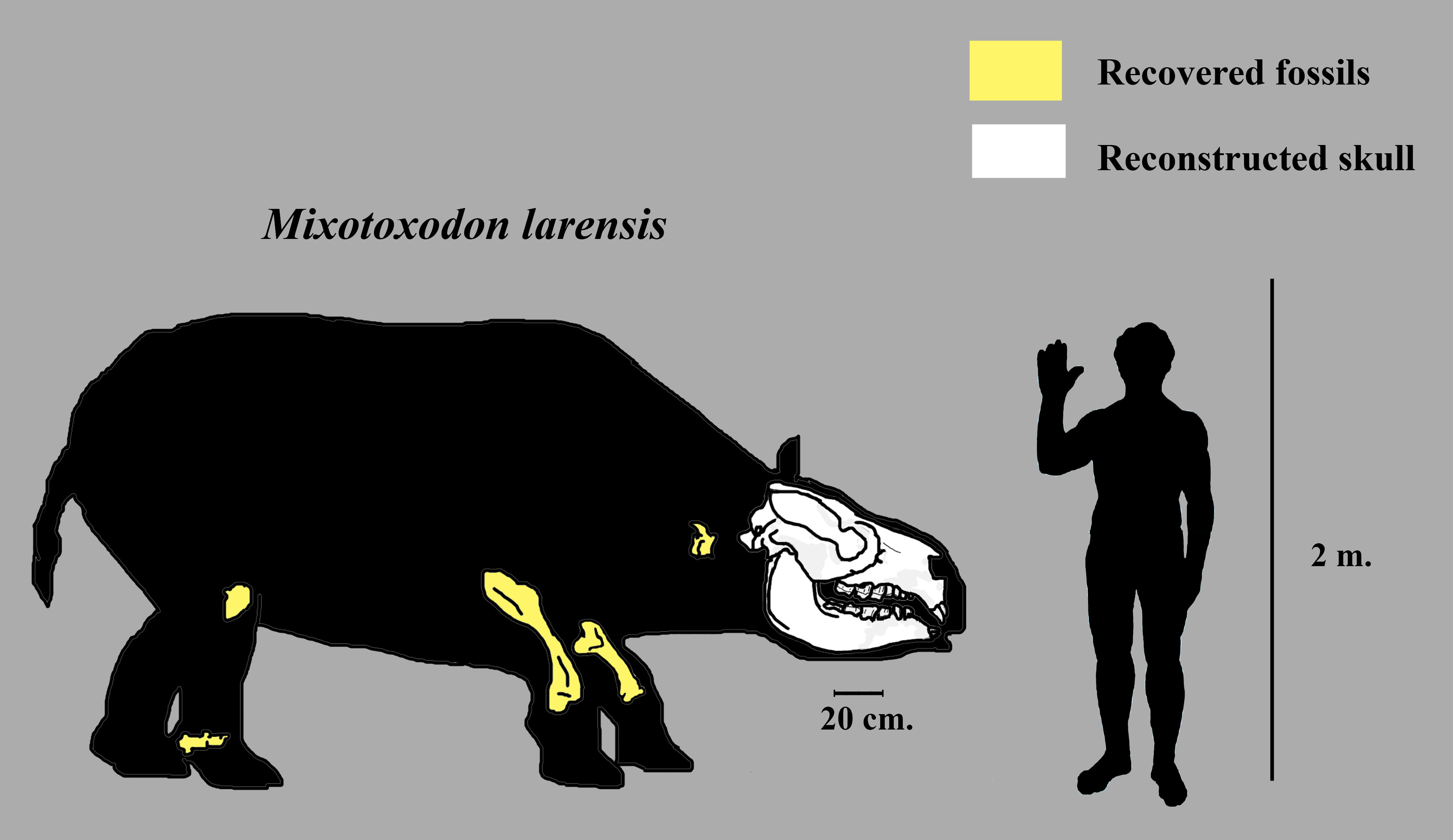

Mixotoxodon is known by fragmentary remains, usually mandible fragments and teeth. Although the general appearance probably was very similar to another toxodontid from the Pleistocene, the better known Toxodon, their fossils shown that the outer borders of the symphysis in the lower jaw don't diverge anteriorly, and the incisors form a semicircular structure that protrude less than the incisors of Toxodon; the snout was cylindrical, instead of the broad hippo-like muzzle of Toxodon. The straight snout and the narrow lower incisors closely packed, suggest that this animal had a different feeding strategy compared to their southern relative, although the teeth of both genera were adapted to deal with abrasive food.

=== Size ===
Mixotoxodon was a rhino-sized animal, a 2012 study estimated a weight of up to 3.8 tonnes (4.2 short tons), which makes it the largest member of Notoungulata, though this may be an overestimate.

== Paleoecology ==
Mixotoxodon is the only notoungulate known to have migrated out of South America during the Great American Interchange. Its fossils have been found in northern South America, in Central America, in Veracruz and Michoacán, Mexico (with a possible find in Tamaulipas), and eastern Texas, US.

== Fossil distribution ==
This list indicates the countries and places where Mixotoxodon fossils have been found. The list follows Rincón, 2011, unless otherwise indicated:

North America

- United States
  - Harris County, Texas
- Mexico
  - Hihuitlán, Michoacán
  - La Estribera, Veracruz (Polaco et al., 2004)
- Guatemala
  - Santa Amelia River, Petén Department (Woodburne, 1969)
- Honduras
  - Yeroconte, Lempira department (Webb and Perrigo, 1984)
  - Orillas del Humuya, Comayagua department
- El Salvador
  - Tomayate, San Salvador department (Cisneros, 2005)
  - Cuscatlán Formation, Barranca del Sisimico, San Vicente department
  - Hormiguero, San Miguel department (Webb and Perrigo, 1984)
- Nicaragua
  - El Bosque, Estelí department (Leidy, 1886)
- Costa Rica
  - Bajo de los Barrantes, Alajuela province (Laurito, 1993; Valerio, 1939; Spencer et al., 1997)
- Panama
  - Ocú, Herrera Province (Gazin, 1956)

South America

- Colombia
  - Rotinet Formation, Chívolo, Magdalena (De Porta 1959; Villarroel and Clavijo, 2005)
- Venezuela
  - Mene de Inciarte, Zulia (Rincón, 2011)
  - Quebrada Ocando, Falcón State (Bocquentin-Villanueva, 1984)
  - Muaco, Falcón State (Royo y Gómez, 1960, Bocquentin-Villanueva, 1979)
  - Cerro Misión, Falcón State (Rincón, 2004)
  - Zumbador Cave, Falcón State
  - Agua Viva del Totumo, Lara State (Karsten, 1886)
  - San Miguel, Lara Sate (Van Frank, 1957)
  - El Tocuyo, Lara State
  - El Breal de Orocual, Monagas State (Rincón et al., 2009)
- Brazil
  - Juruá River, Acre State (Paula Couto, 1982; Rancy, 1981)
  - Araras/Periquitos, Rondônia
- Bolivia
  - Cara Cara, Beni Department (Hoffstetter, 1968)
- Argentina
  - Dique Los Quiroga, Santiago del Estero

== Phylogeny ==
The cladogram below is based in the study published by Analía Forasiepi and colleagues (2014), showing the position of Mixotoxodon inside Toxodontidae:

- - Pampahippus arenalesi
  - - - Rhynchippus spp.
      - - Scarritia canquelensis
        - Leonitinia gaudri
    - Toxodontidae
      - Proadinotherium leptognathum
      - - - Adinotherium spp.
          - - Nesodon taweretus
            - Nesodon imbricatus
        - - Palyeidodon obtusum
          - - Hyperoxotodon speciosus
            - - - Nonotherium henningi
                - Xotodon spp.
              - - - Andinotoxodon bolivariensis
                  - - - Dinotoxodon paranensis
                      - Toxodon platensis
                    - - Gyrinodon quassus
                      - - Ocnerotherium intermedium
                        - Hoffstetterius imperator
                - - Posnanskytherium desaguaderoi
                  - - Pisanodon nazari
                    - - Pericotoxodon platignathus
                      - - - Calchaquitherium mixtum
                          - Mixotoxodon larensis
                        - - Paratrigodon euguii
                          - Trigodon gaudri
