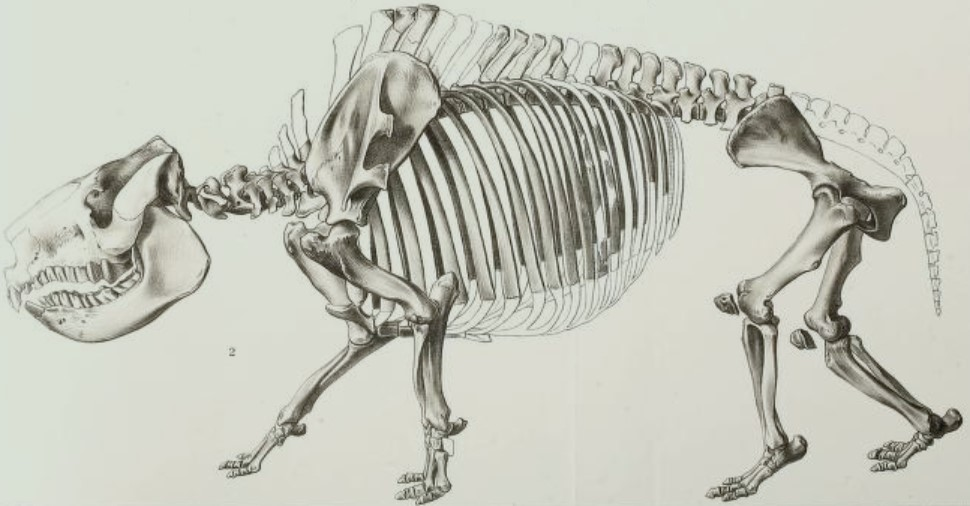
- Nesodon imbricatus skeleton
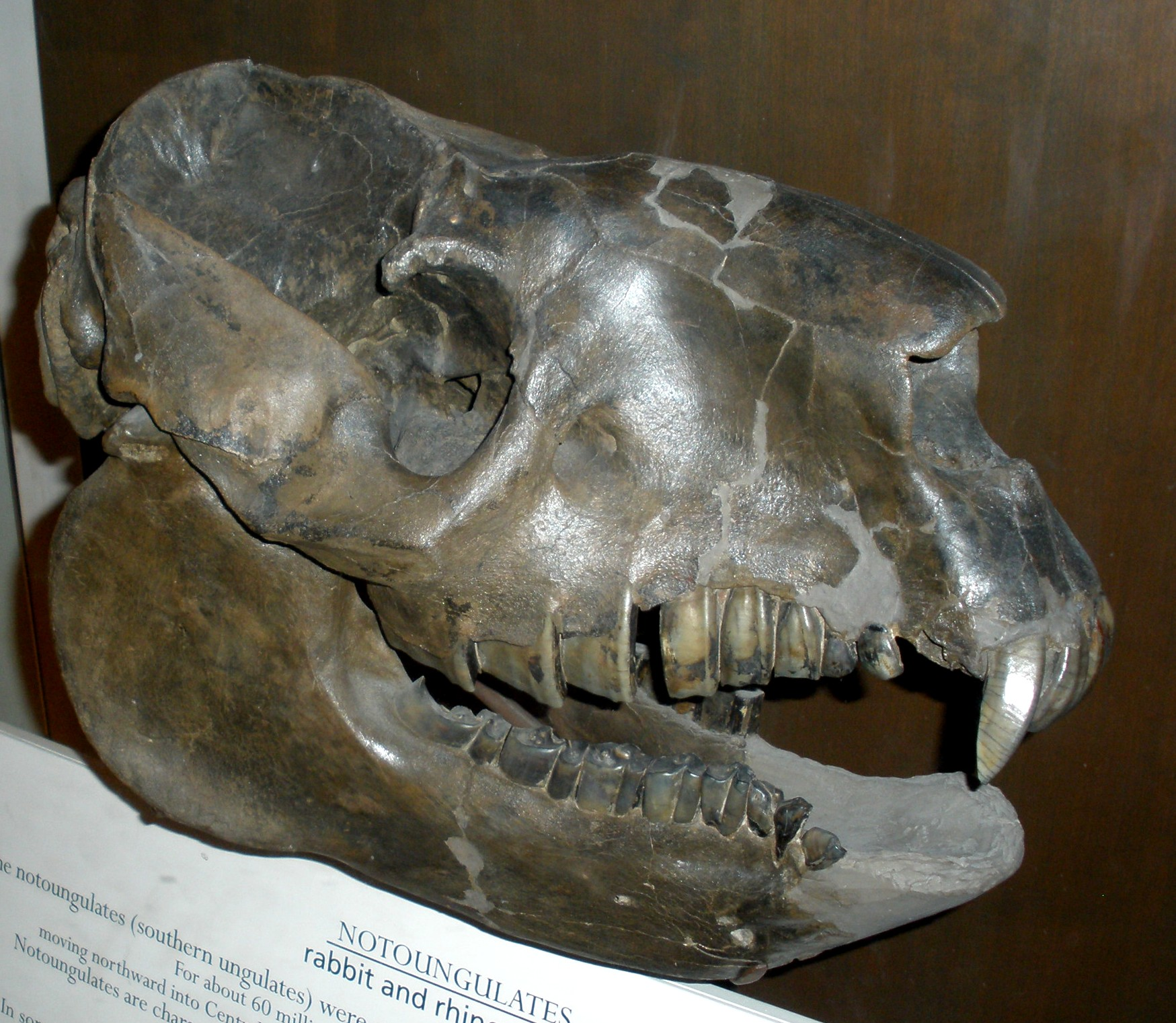
- Nesodon imbricatus skull

Scientific classification
- Domain: Eukaryota
- Kingdom: Animalia
- Phylum: Chordata
- Class: Mammalia
- Order: †Notoungulata
- Family: †Toxodontidae
- Subfamily: †Nesodontinae
- Genus: †Nesodon; Owen, 1846

Type species
- †Nesodon imbricatus

Species
- N. conspurcatus Ameghino 1887; N. cornutus; N. imbricatus Owen 1846; N. taweretus Forasiepi et al. 2014

Synonyms
- Lithops Ameghino 1887; Adelphotherium Ameghino 1887; Gronotherium Ameghino 1887; Atryptherium Ameghino 1887; Rhadinotherium Ameghino 1887; Protoxodon Ameghino 1887; Acrotherium Ameghino 1891; Palaeolithops Ameghino 1891; Xotoprodon Ameghino 1891; Nesotherium Mercerat 1891

= Nesodon =

Nesodon Temporal range: Early Miocene (Deseadan-Friasian) ~23.03–15.5 Ma

Extinct genus of notoungulates

Nesodon ("island tooth") is a genus of Miocene mammal belonging to the extinct order Notoungulata which inhabited southern South America during the Late Oligocene to Miocene living from 29.0 to 16.3 Ma and existed for approximately 12.7 million years. It had a relatively large size, weighing up to 554 kg (1221 lbs) and reaching 1.5 m in height.

== Taxonomy ==
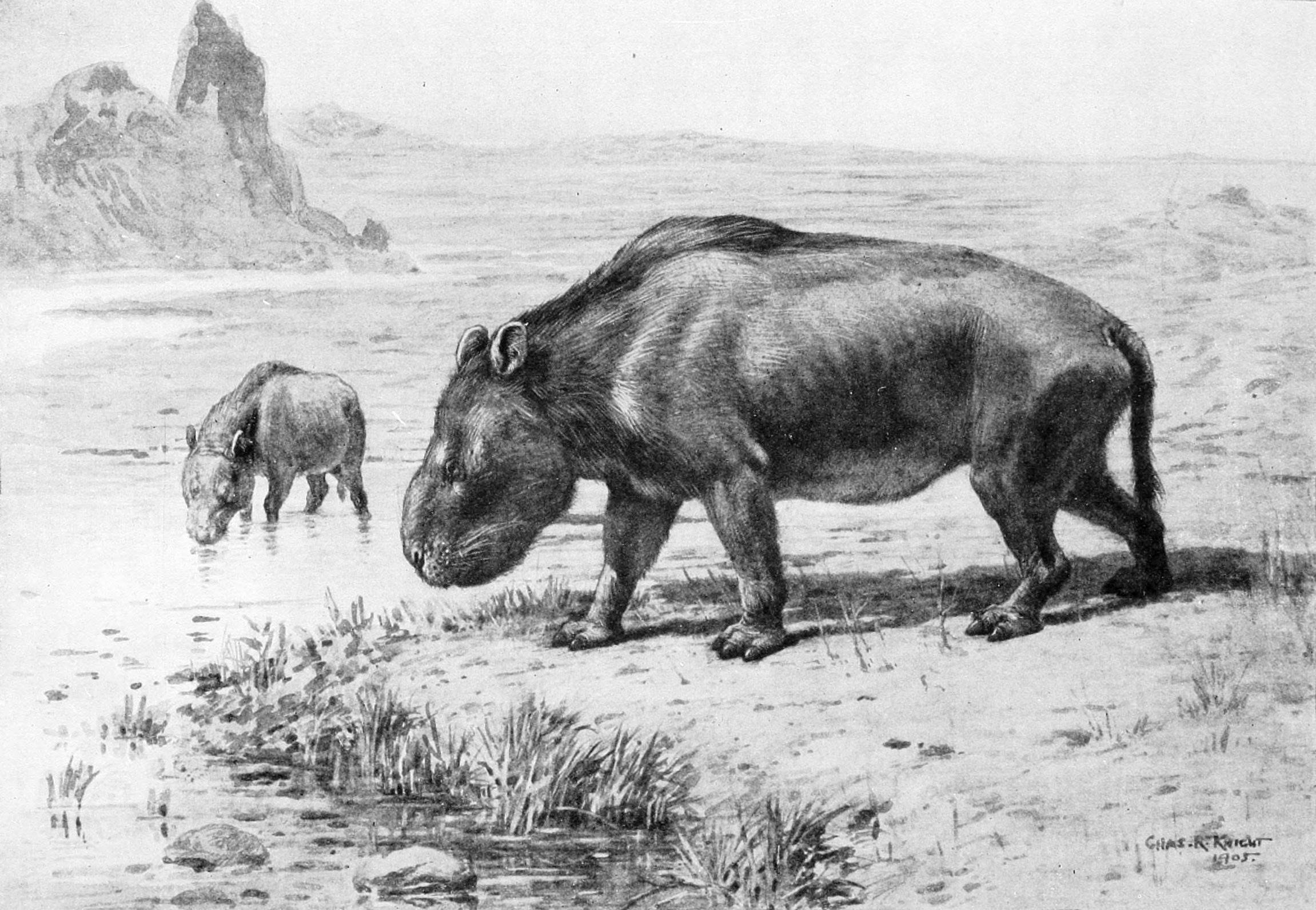
N. imbricatus restoration by Charles R. Knight, 1905

Nesodon was named by Owen (1846). It was assigned to Toxodontidae by Carroll (1988). It was an early member of the family Toxodontidae, which included the well-known Pleistocene genus Toxodon. Like almost all toxodontids, Nesodon was endemic to South America. In particular, fossils of Nesodon are known from late early Miocene (Santacrucian SALMA) deposits of Argentina and Chile.

Three species of Nesodon are recognized including a larger species, N. imbricatus, and a smaller species, N. conspurcatus. A poorly known and possibly invalid third species, N. cornutus, was similar to N. imbricatus but may have had a small horn on its head. All species of Nesodon were larger than species of the contemporary toxodontid Adinotherium.

The dentition of Nesodon shows features typical of living grazing (grass-eating) mammals, but a study of wear on the enamel of N. imbricatus suggests that it was a browser (leaf eater) that may have supplemented its diet with fruit or bark.

== Classification ==
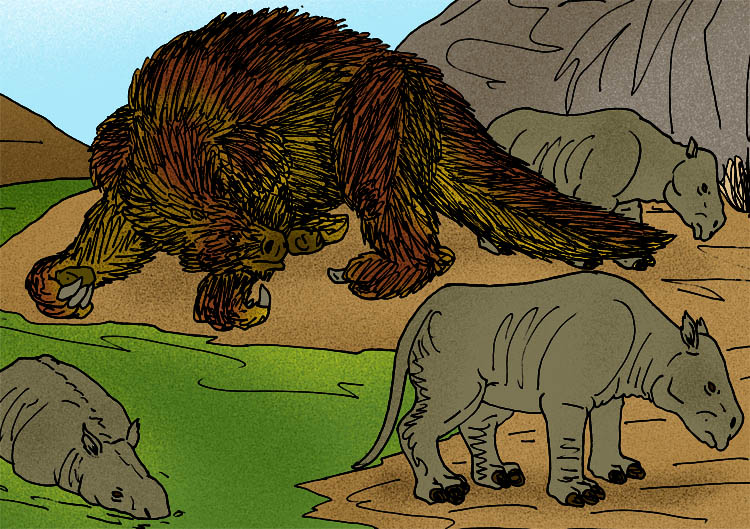
Promegatherium nanum and Nesodon.

In 2014, a study identifying a new species of Nesodon, N. taweretus, resolved the families phylogenetic relations, deriving the cladogram shown below:

- - Pampahippus arenalesi
  - - - Rhynchippus spp.
      - - Scarritia canquelensis
        - Leonitinia gaudri
    - Toxodontidae
      - Proadinotherium leptognathum
      - - - Adinotherium spp.
          - - Nesodon taweretus
            - Nesodon imbricatus
        - - Palyeidodon obtusum
          - - Hyperoxotodon speciosus
            - - - Nonotherium henningi
                - Xotodon spp.
              - - - Andinotoxodon bolivariensis
                  - - - Dinotoxodon paranensis
                      - Toxodon platensis
                    - - Gyrinodon quassus
                      - - Ocnerotherium intermedium
                        - Hoffstetterius imperator
                - - Posnanskytherium desaguaderoi
                  - - Pisanodon nazari
                    - - Pericotoxodon platignathus
                      - - - Calchaquitherium mixtum
                          - Mixotoxodon larensis
                        - - Paratrigodon euguii
                          - Trigodon gaudri

== Distribution ==
Fossils of Nesodon have been found in:

- Deseado and Santa Cruz Formation, Argentina
- Chucal and Río Frías Formations, Chile
