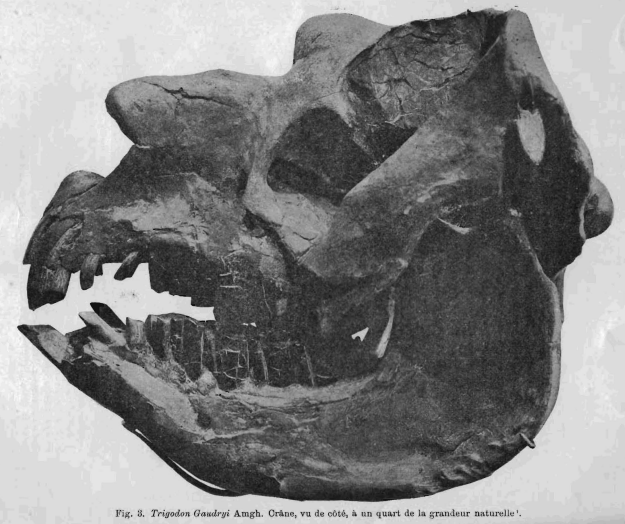
- Skull of T. gaudryi

Scientific classification
- Kingdom: Animalia
- Phylum: Chordata
- Class: Mammalia
- Order: †Notoungulata
- Family: †Toxodontidae
- Subfamily: †Toxodontinae
- Genus: †Trigodon; Ameghino, 1887
- Species: †T. gaudryi

Binomial name
- †Trigodon gaudryi Ameghino, 1887

Synonyms
- Trigodon gaudri; Trigodon gaudry

= Trigodon =

Trigodon Temporal range: Late Miocene-Pliocene (Mayoan-Montehermosan) ~11.608–4.0 Ma

Extinct genus of mammal

Trigodon is an extinct genus of the family Toxodontidae, a large-bodied notoungulate which inhabited South America during the Late Miocene to Early Pliocene (Mayoan to Montehermosan in the SALMA classification), living from 11.61 to 4.0 Ma which existed for approximately 7.61 million years. The type species is T. gaudryi. It bore a superficial resemblance to a rhinoceros, in that it had a horn on its forehead, and was one of a few horned notoungulates, including Adinotherium and Leontinia.

== Taxonomy ==
Trigodon is placed within the family Toxodontidae, within the suborder Toxodontia. It is considered closest to Paratrigodon. Historically, the genus Adinotherium was suggested to be ancestral to Trigodon, while others claim Nesodon was the direct ancestor to the genus, though neither hypothesis is thought to be true in the modern day.

Phylogeny after Forasiepi et al;

- - Pampahippus arenalesi
  - - - Rhynchippus spp.
      - - Scarrittia canquelensis
        - Leonitinia gaudri
    - Toxodontidae
      - Proadinotherium leptognathum
      - - - Adinotherium spp.
          - - Nesodon taweretus
            - Nesodon imbricatus
        - - Palyeidodon obtusum
          - - Hyperoxotodon speciosus
            - - - Nonotherium henningi
                - Xotodon spp.
              - - - Andinotoxodon bolivariensis
                  - - - Dinotoxodon paranensis
                      - Toxodon platensis
                    - - Gyrinodon quassus
                      - - Ocnerotherium intermedium
                        - Hoffstetterius imperator
                - - Posnanskytherium desaguaderoi
                  - - Pisanodon nazari
                    - - Pericotoxodon platignathus
                      - - - Calchaquitherium mixtum
                          - Mixotoxodon larensis
                        - - Paratrigodon euguii
                          - Trigodon gaudryi

== Description ==
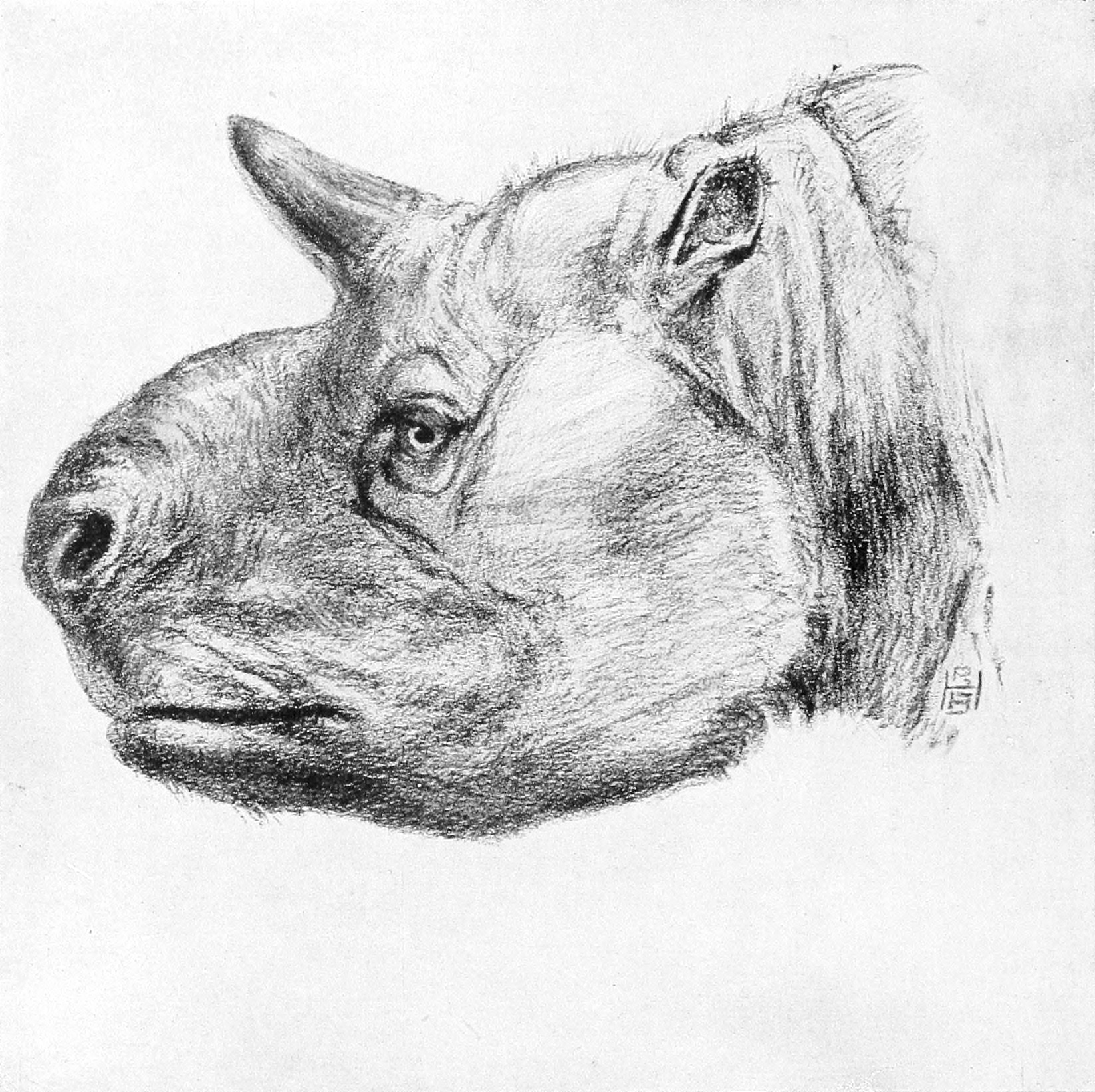
Reconstruction of Trigodon by Robert Bruce Horsfall

Trigodon was a large animal, weighing around 1,000 kg (2,200 lb), though it was smaller than the later Toxodon. The most conspicuous element of the genus is the bony knob which sits on the forehead, which was possibly covered with keratin in life, similar to the horns of a rhinoceros or a bovid.

=== Skull ===
The protuberance for which Trigodon is most recognizable is derived from the anterior end of the saggital plane. The surface of the bump itself is rugose, suggesting a keratinous covering. The development of the horn itself is similar to the nasal protuberance of Arsinoitherium, though to a lesser degree as the horn isn't bifurcated or elevated to the same degree. Anatomically the protrusion is closest to the boss of Elasmotherium, though the protuberance of Trigodon pushes more forward than the boss of Elasmotherium. There is a smaller, second horn on the nasal, indicated by the rugosity and thickness of the free anterior end of the bone. The nasal canal is separated by an ossified septum, though the bone is fragmentary in preserved specimens.

The rest of the skull is shaped triangularly, with the skull widening near to the anterior. The symphyseal region of the mandible is greatly slanted upwards. The occipital condyles are pushed back far, with a rugose depression in the occipital plane acting as an attachment point for the cervical tendons. The skull's length is 68 cm (27 in) from the occipital condyles to the incisors. The height of the skull from the mandible to the border of the horn is 56 cm (22 in). The width of the skull, from tympanal bone to tympanal bone, is 53 cm (21 in). The brain size of Trigodon was exceedling small.

==== Dentition ====
The namesake of Trigodon is its triangular incisors, of which it (uniquely) possesses one along the mandibular symphysis, bordered by a pair on each side, meaning it has an uneven number of 5 incisors. Some interpret this as a fusion of the median incisors, resulting in a dental formula of ?3.1.3.3?3.1.3.3. The cheek teeth of the genus are hypselodont. The upper molars have an internal groove and an internal column.

=== Appendicular skeleton ===
No postcranial elements are known from Trigodon, but the size of the skull suggests it was large bodied, similar to Toxodon.

== Paleoenvironment ==
Trigodon is known from many Miocene and Pliocene formations in South America, and is known to have lived alongside the glyptodont Nopachtus in the San Bartolomé fossil locality, a fluvial depositional site that was likely a floodplain during the Pliocene.

The genus is known from

- Monte Hermoso Formation, Argentina
- Solimões Formation, Acre State, Brazil, eastern slope of Andes Mountains.
- San Bartolomé, Córdoba, Argentina.
