= List of fossiliferous stratigraphic units in Venezuela =

Major fossiliferous stratigraphic units in Venezuela
Mesa Formation
Urumaco, San Gregorio & Codore Formations
Capadare Formation
Santa Inés Formation
Socorro Formation
Parángula Formation
Río Yuca Formation
Cantaure Formation
Castillo Formation
La Luna Formation
Apón Formation
La Quinta Formation
Río Cachirí Group
Caparo Formation

This is a list of fossiliferous stratigraphic units in Venezuela.

== List of fossiliferous stratigraphic units ==
Group	Formation	Period	Notes
	Blanquilla Formation	Late Pleistocene	
	Abisinia Formation	Early Pleistocene	
	Mesa Formation	Ensenadan	
	Cumaná Formation	Early-Late Pleistocene	
	San Gregorio Formation	Chapadmalalan-Uquian	
	Caujarao Formation	Chasicoan-Late Pleistocene	
	Codore Formation	Montehermosan-Early Pleistocene	
Cabo Blanco	Guaiguaza Clay	Late Pliocene	
Cabo Blanco	Playa Grande Formation	Early Pliocene	
Cabo Blanco	Mare Formation	Early Pliocene	
Cubagua	Araya Formation	Late Pliocene	
Cubagua	Cerro Negro Formation	Early Pliocene	
Cubagua	Punta Gavilán Formation	Zanclean	
	La Vela Formation	Pliocene	
	Paraguaná Formation	Early Pliocene	
	Cubagua Formation	Late Miocene-Early Pliocene	
	Urumaco Formation	Laventan-Huayquerian	
	La Puerta Formation	Late Miocene	
	El Veral Formation	Late Miocene	
	Buenevara Adentro Formation	Langhian	
	El Porvenir Formation	Langhian	
	Chiguale Formation	Middle Miocene	
	Capadare Formation	Laventan	
	Santa Inés Formation	Laventan	
	Socorro Formation	Laventan	
	Parángula Formation	Friasian	
	Río Yuca Formation	Santacrucian-Friasian	
	Cantaure Formation	Santacrucian	
	Chaguaramas Formation	Santacrucian	
	Cerro Pelado Formation	Early-Mid Miocene	
	Agua Clara Formation	Burdigalian	
	La Rosa Formation	Early-Mid Miocene	
	Querales Formation	Burdigalian	
	Guamacire Formation	Early Miocene	
	Pedregoso Formation	Early Miocene	
	Brasso Clay	Neogene	
	Castillo Formation	Deseadan	
	San Luis Formation	Chattian	
	Patiecitos Formation	Chattian	
	Areo Formation	Oligocene	
	Carapita Formation	Oligocene	
	Los Bagres Formation	Oligocene	
	Roblecito Formation	Oligocene	
	Santa Rita Formation	Priabonian	
	Santa Anita Formation	Late Eocene	
	Paguey Formation	Middle Eocene	
	Mirador Formation	Late Paleocene-Mid Eocene	
	Misoa Formation	Early Eocene	
	Guárica Formation	Paleocene	
	Guasare Formation	Paleocene	
	Navay Formation	Late Cretaceous	
	La Luna Formation	Early Cenomanian-Coniacian	
Cogollo	Cogollo Formation	Late Aptian-Early Cenomanian	
	Lisure Formation	Albian	
	La Puya Formation	Albian	
	Querecual Formation	Albian	
	Chimana Formation	Late Aptian-Early Albian	
	Machiques Formation	Aptian-Early Albian	
	García Formation	Late Aptian	
	Valle Grande Formation	Late Aptian	
	Apón Formation	Aptian	
	Tibú Formation	Late Aptian	
	Barranquín Formation	Barremian-Early Albian	
	Macoita Formation	Callovian	
	Tinacoa Formation	Early-Middle Jurassic	
	La Quinta Formation	Hettangian	
	Palmarito Formation	Asselian-Kungurian	
	Campo Chico Formation	Eifelian-Early Frasnian	
Río Cachirí	Caño del Oeste Formation	Eifelian-Givetian	
Río Cachirí	Caño Grande Formation	Pragian-Eifelian	
	El Horno Formation	Llandovery-Ludlow	
	Caparo Formation	Costonian-Longvillian	
	Mireles Formation	Tremadocian	

== See also ==
- Geology of Venezuela
- Gomphothere fossils in Venezuela
- List of fossiliferous stratigraphic units in Colombia
- List of fossiliferous stratigraphic units in Curaçao
- List of fossiliferous stratigraphic units in Guyana
- List of fossiliferous stratigraphic units in Trinidad and Tobago
- South American land mammal ages
