= Takutu Formation =

Geologic formation in Brazil and Guyana

- Stratigraphic range: Late Jurassic
- Type: Geological formation
- Unit of: Rewa Group

Lithology
- Primary: Sandstone

Location
- Coordinates: 3.0°N 59.7°W
- Approximate paleocoordinates: 3.2°N 27.4°W
- Region: Upper Takutu-Upper Essequibo
- Country: Brazil; Guyana
- Extent: Guyana Shield

Type section
- Named for: Takutu River
- Takutu Formation (Guyana)

The Takutu Formation is a Late Jurassic geologic formation in Guyana and northern Brazil. The formation comprises sandstones deposited in a shallow water to littoral setting. Fossil theropod tracks (a type of dinosaur) have been reported from the formation. A paleobotanic analysis of drill cores of the formation was conducted by Thomas van der Hammen in 1966 and showed fossil Classiopolis flora.

== See also ==
- List of dinosaur-bearing rock formations
  - List of stratigraphic units with theropod tracks
- List of fossiliferous stratigraphic units in Guyana
