= List of fossiliferous stratigraphic units in Guyana =

Fossiliferous stratigraphic units in Guyana
Takutu Formation

This is a list of fossiliferous stratigraphic units in Guyana.

== List of fossiliferous stratigraphic units ==
Group	Formation	Period	Notes
Rewa Group	Takutu Formation	Late Jurassic	

== See also ==
- Geology of Guyana
- South American land mammal age
- List of fossiliferous stratigraphic units in Venezuela
