= San Gregorio Formation, Venezuela =

Geologic formation in Venezuela

San Gregorio Formation
- Stratigraphic range: Zanclean-Chibanian (Chapadmalalan-Lujanian); ~5.33–0.709100 Ma
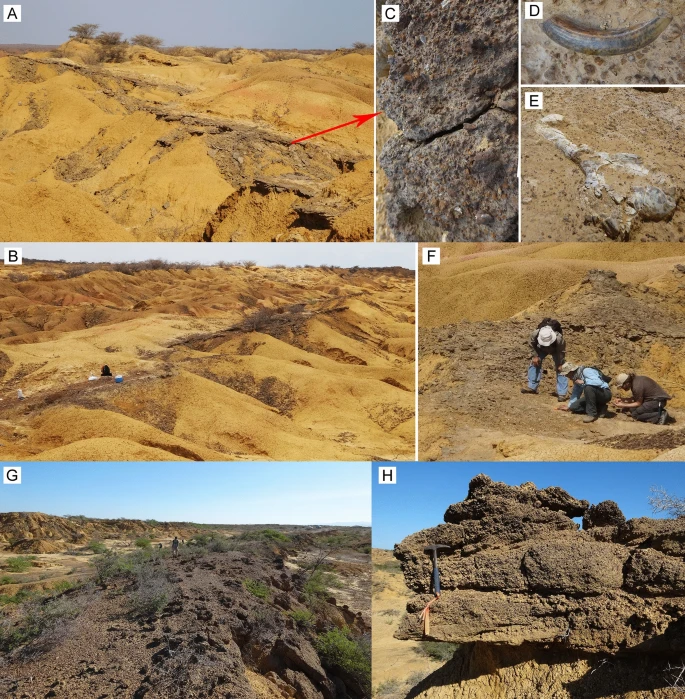
- Unit of: Urumaco stratigraphic section
- Sub-units: Vergel Member Cocuiza Member
- Overlies: Codore Formation
- Thickness: ~570 m (1,870 ft)

Lithology
- Primary: Sandstone, mudstone
- Other: Limestone

Location
- Country: Venezuela

Type section
- Named for: San Gregorio, Venezuela
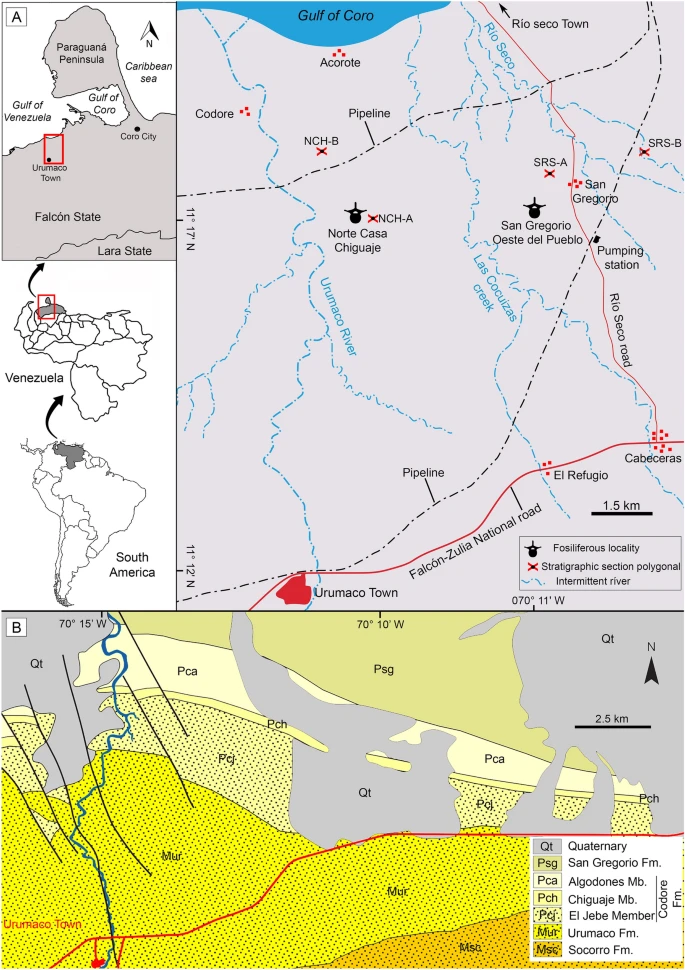

The San Gregorio Formation is a lithostratigraphic unit dating back to the Pliocene to Pleistocene of Venezuela. The formation is split into three members, the older Vergel Member (Late Pliocene to earliest Pleistocene), the Cocuiza Member (Pleistocene) and the Río Seco Member. During this time the region is thought to have been covered by a mixed environment of open grassland and forested areas surrounding a permanent freshwater system. The diverse fauna of the San Gregorio Formation, including a variety of freshwater fish, crocodilians, turtles and snakes, also includes many mammals interpreted to have been part of the first major wave of the Great American Interchange in addition to native clades such as glyptodonts, ground sloths and caviomorph rodents.

== Stratigraphy ==
The San Gregorio Formation overlies the Codore Formation and forms the most recent sequence of the stratigraphic section. Outcrops of this formation are found in Falcón State, northeast of the town of Urumaco. The formation is named for the town of San Gregorio, Venezuela.

Robert Masterman Stainforth divided the San Gregorio Formation into three subsections. The oldest of these is the Vergel Member, composed of 260 meters of sandstone, mudstone and sparse conglomerates. In their study on the formation Carrillo-Briceño and colleagues determined a late Pliocene to earliest Pleistocene age. Overlying the Vergel Member is the Cocuiza Member, a sequence of 80 meters composed of sandstone, mudstone and limestone. Using strontium dating, an age between 0.709100 and 0.709342 Ma was determined for the Cocuiza Member. Some samples utilized suggested that they had been chemically altered, while two localities yielded an early Pleistocene age. The third member recognized by Stainforth is the Rio Seco Member, however it has not been dated by the 2021 study by Carrillo-Briceño and colleagues.

== Paleoenvironment ==
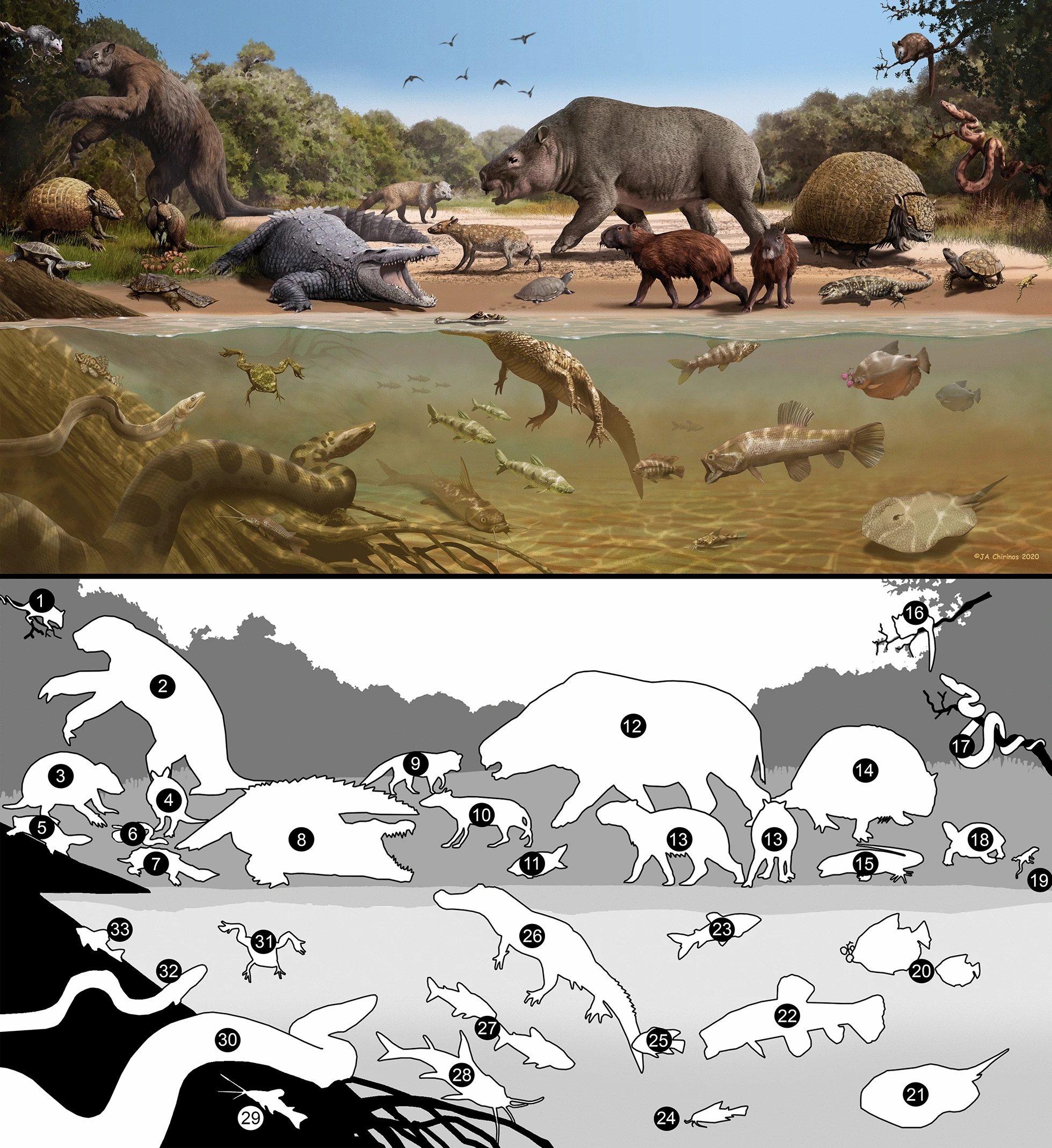
Paleofauna of the San Gregorio Formation

The fish fauna of the Vergel Member, showcasing a great abundance of catfish in particular, clearly shows that permanent rivers played a vital part in the environment of the Pliocene San Gregorio Formation. The stingray Potamotrygon in particular is commonly associated with flowing waters and sandy banks, although it can also be found in still waters. Overall the depositional environment may have been consisting of floodplains and braided rivers alongside a series of other environments. Swamps, ponds and flooded areas for instance are also possible and may have been home to armored catfish and swamp eels, whose modern members are known to inhabit oxygen-poor bodies of water. Aside from freshwater fish, some fossils also indicate the presence of animal's capable of tolerating a wider range of salt (such as Sciades), possibly indicating a proximity to marine environments. The presence of foraminiferans with low tolerance for saltwater supports this, suggesting that the region also featured estuaries. Frogs, podocnemidid turtles and caimans are all indicative of freshwater environments of varying nature, while Crocodylus falconensis could have easily inhabited areas closer to the coast. Matamata turtes meanwhile are generally associated with slow moving waters, marshes and swamps. Other animals found in the Vergel Member associated with bodies of water include freshwater molluscs and crabs, the False Coral Snake which requires humid soil and prehistoric relatives of the Capybara. This highly diverse fauna indicates that the Vergel member heavily featured permanent bodies of freshwater, likely rivers, as well as other slower moving bodies of water such as swamps, marshes and/or ponds.

The terrestrial fauna features a variety of endemic South American mammals ranging from notoungulates, ground sloths, glyptodonts to smaller types of armadillos. These animals would suggest a forested-grassland environment, with the presence of the genus Corallus, a tree boa, clearly indicating the presence of forested areas. This is supported by the palynoflora, which shows the presence of plants associated with rainforests. However, the general size of seeds and fruits found in the Norte Casa Chiguaje locality is more in-line with open environments, ultimately suggesting an environment featuring both forested areas as well as more open grassland.

The Cocuiza Member meanwhile represents a mostly marine environment following marine incurions in northern South America. The presence of sharks, echinoderms, oyster colonies and marine gastropods suggests a coastal setting. Fossils of terrestrial and freshwater fauna discovered in the San Gregorio Oeste del Pueblo (SGOP) Locality has been interpreted to represent carcasses that were washed into the ocean by streams and rivers of the backshore, supported by the disarticulated and fragmentary nature of most remains found in the Cocuiza Member. However, the fauna discovered in this member suggests that an environment similar to that of the older Vergel Member (forested grassland mixed with wetlands or permanent freshwater habitats) was found further inland, providing the locality with its freshwater and terrestrial fossil remains.

The rainforest taxa recovered from the Vergel Member's flora are absent from the Cocuiza Member, suggesting that drying climate during the Pliocene-Pleistocene transition caused a great turnover in the flora of the northern neotropics.

The composition of the Rio Seco Member suggests a fluvial environment.

== Paleoflora ==
Color key: Taxon / Reclassified taxon / Taxon falsely reported as present / Dubious taxon or junior synonym / Ichnotaxon / Ootaxon / Morphotaxon	Notes; Uncertain or tentative taxa are in small text; ~~crossed out~~ taxa are discredited.

Name	Species	Member	Material	Notes	Image
Amaranthaceae		Vergel Member			
Asteraceae		Vergel Member			
aff. Cleomaceae		Vergel Member			
Cucurbitaceae		Vergel Member			
Poaceae		Vergel Member		grasses resembling Chloroideae	
aff. Vitaceae		Vergel Member			

== Paleofauna ==
=== Molluscs ===
Name	Species	Member	Material	Notes	Image
Bivalvia indet.		Vergel Member			
Gastropoda indet.		Vergel Member			
cf. Planorbidae		Vergel Member			
Ostreidae		Cocuiza Member			

=== Crustaceans ===
Name	Species	Member	Material	Notes	Image
Trichodactylidae indet.		Vergel Member			

=== Echinoderms ===
Name	Species	Member	Material	Notes	Image
Agassizia	A. excentrica	Cocuiza Member			
Arbacia	A. punctulata	Cocuiza Member			
Encope	E. cf. emarginata	Cocuiza Member			
Encope	E. secoensis	Cocuiza Member			
Mellitella	M. falconensis	Cocuiza Member			
Moira	M. atropos	Cocuiza Member			

=== Fish ===
Name	Species	Member	Material	Notes	Image
Actinopterygii indet.		Vergel Member	abundant isolated material		
cf. Amblydoras	cf. A. sp.	Vergel Member	a partial cleithrum	the first recorded fossil of the genus	
Callichthyidae indet.		Vergel Member	fin spine fragments and bony armor plates	one or more species of armored catfish	
Cichlidae indet.		Vergel Member	fin spines		
Doradidae indet.		Vergel Member	fin spines, scutes and skull remains	while some elements may represent Amblydoras and Scorpiodoras, other fossils may represent a third genus was present in the region	
Hoplias	H. sp.	Vergel Member	isolated teeth		
Hypostominae indet.		Vergel Member	fin spines fragments and dermal teeth	some specimen are similar to Hemiancistrus, but are too fragmentary to be referred to the genus	
Loricariidae indet.		Vergel Member	parts of the pectoral spine and armor plates	the elements are too fragmentary to safely refer to Hypostominae that are present in the formation	
cf. Megaleporinus	cf. M. sp.	Vergel Member	two symphyseal premaxillary teeth		
Myliobatiformes indet.		Vergel Member	a single isolated vertebra		
Mylossoma	M. sp.	Vergel Member	dentary teeth	a "pacu clade" serrasalmid	
cf. Pimelodella	cf. P. sp.	Vergel Member	incomplete pectoral fin-spine		
Pimeloidea indet.		Vergel Member	pectoral spines		
cf. Platysilurus	cf. P. sp.	Vergel Member	pectoral spines		
Potamotrygon	P. sp.	Vergel Member	isolated teeth and caudal spines		
Schizodon	cf. S. corti	Vergel Member	teeth of the premaxilla and dentary		
cf. Sciades	cf. S. sp.	Vergel Member	a fragmented dorsal spine		
cf. Scorpiodoras	cf. S. sp.	Vergel Member	a partial cleithrum	the first recorded fossil of the genus	
Serrasalmidae indet.		Vergel Member	isolated teeth	possibly one or several species of the "pacu" or "Myleus clade"	
Siluriformes indet.		Vergel Member	eroded and isolated elements of the skull and postcrania		
Synbranchus	S. sp.	Vergel Member	dentaries, a pharyngeal bone with teeth and vertebrae	a genus of swamp eel	
Bagre	B. marinus	Cocuiza Member			

=== Amphibians ===
Name	Species	Member	Material	Notes	Image
Anura indet.		Vergel Member	isolated cranial and postcranial elements		
cf. Pipa	cf. P. sp.	Vergel Member	sacral vertebrae fused to a partial urostyle		

=== Reptilians ===
Name	Species	Member	Material	Notes	Image
Anilius	A. scytale	Vergel Member	incomplete trunk vertebra	the extant American Pipe Snake or False Coral Snake	
Boidae indet.		Vergel Member	isolated vertebrae	similar to the genus Epicrates	
Boidae/Aniliidae indet.		Vergel Member	incomplete trunk vertebra		
Caimaninae indet.		Vergel Member Cocuiza Member	cranial and postcranial remains		
Chelonoidis	C. sp.	Vergel Member	incomplete right femur		
Chelus	C. sp.	Vergel Member	plastron fragment	A type of Mata mata turtle	
Colubroides indet.		Vergel Member	fragmentary trunk vertebra		
Corallus	C. sp.	Vergel Member	incomplete trunk vertebra	a moderately large tree boa	
Crocodylus	C. falconensis	Vergel Member			
Podocnemididae indet.		Vergel Member	various postcranial remains		
Serpentes indet.		Vergel Member	fragmentary trunk vertebrae		
Squamata indet.		Vergel Member	fragmentary skulls	non-snake squamates	
Testudines indet.		Vergel Member	fragmentary skulls, shell and assorted other postcranial remains		
Tupinambis s.l.	T. sp.	Vergel Member	dentary fragment	a large sized teiid lizard	
Caiman	aff. C. yacare	Cocuiza Member	maxillary fragment		
Crocodylia indet.		Vergel Member Cocuiza Member	coprolites, teeth, osteoderms and other bones		
Eunectes	E. sp.	Cocuiza Member	trunk vertebra	a large anaconda	

=== Mammals ===
Name	Species	Member	Material	Notes	Image
aff. Boreostemma	aff. B. sp.	Vergel Member	two osteoderms		
?Caviomorpha indet.		Vergel Member	isolated teeth and tooth fragments		
Cricetidae indet.		Vergel Member		currently undescribed	
Cyonasua	C. sp.	Vergel Member			
cf. Didelphis	cf. D. sp.	Vergel Member	partial humerus	a type of Opossum	
Falcontoxodon	F. sp.	Vergel Member	teeth, ankle bones and a metatarsal		
aff. Holmesina	aff. H. floridanus	Vergel Member Cocuiza Member	osteoderms		
Hydrochoerinae indet.		Vergel Member	fragmentary teeth		
Hydrochoeropsis	?Hydrochoeropsis wayuu	Vergel Member	a dentary and molars	an extinct relative of the Capybara	
Interatheriidae indet.		Vergel Member	an isolated tooth crown		
Mammalia indet.		Vergel Member Cocuiza Member	various postcranial remains		
Marisela	Marisela gregoriana	Vergel Member	an isolated molar		
Mylodontidae indet.		Vergel Member	right humerus		
Neoepiblemidae indet.		Vergel Member	distal phalanx		
aff. Plaina	aff. P. sp.	Vergel Member	osteoderm		
Pliodasypus	Pliodasypus vergelianu	Vergel Member			
cf. Proeremotherium	cf. P. sp.	Vergel Member Cocuiza Member	a nearly complete skull and an isolated tooth		
Proterotheriidae indet.		Vergel Member	metacarpal remains		
Typotheria incerta sedis		Vergel Member	a partial jaw		
Camelidae indet.		Cocuiza Member	a fragmentary femur		
Chapalmalania	C. sp.	Cocuiza Member	partial hemimandible	a large bodied procyonid	
Sirenia indet.		Cocuiza Member			
Toxodontidae indet.		Cocuiza Member	teeth and a partial mandible		
Xenarthra indet.		Cocuiza Member	incomplete caudal vertebra		
