= Brasso Clay =

Fossil formation in Trinidad and Tobago

- Stratigraphic range: Neogene
- Type: Formation

Location
- Country: Trinidad and Tobago

The Brasso Clay is a geologic formation in Trinidad and Tobago. It preserves fossils dating back to the Neogene period.

== See also ==
- List of fossiliferous stratigraphic units in Trinidad and Tobago
