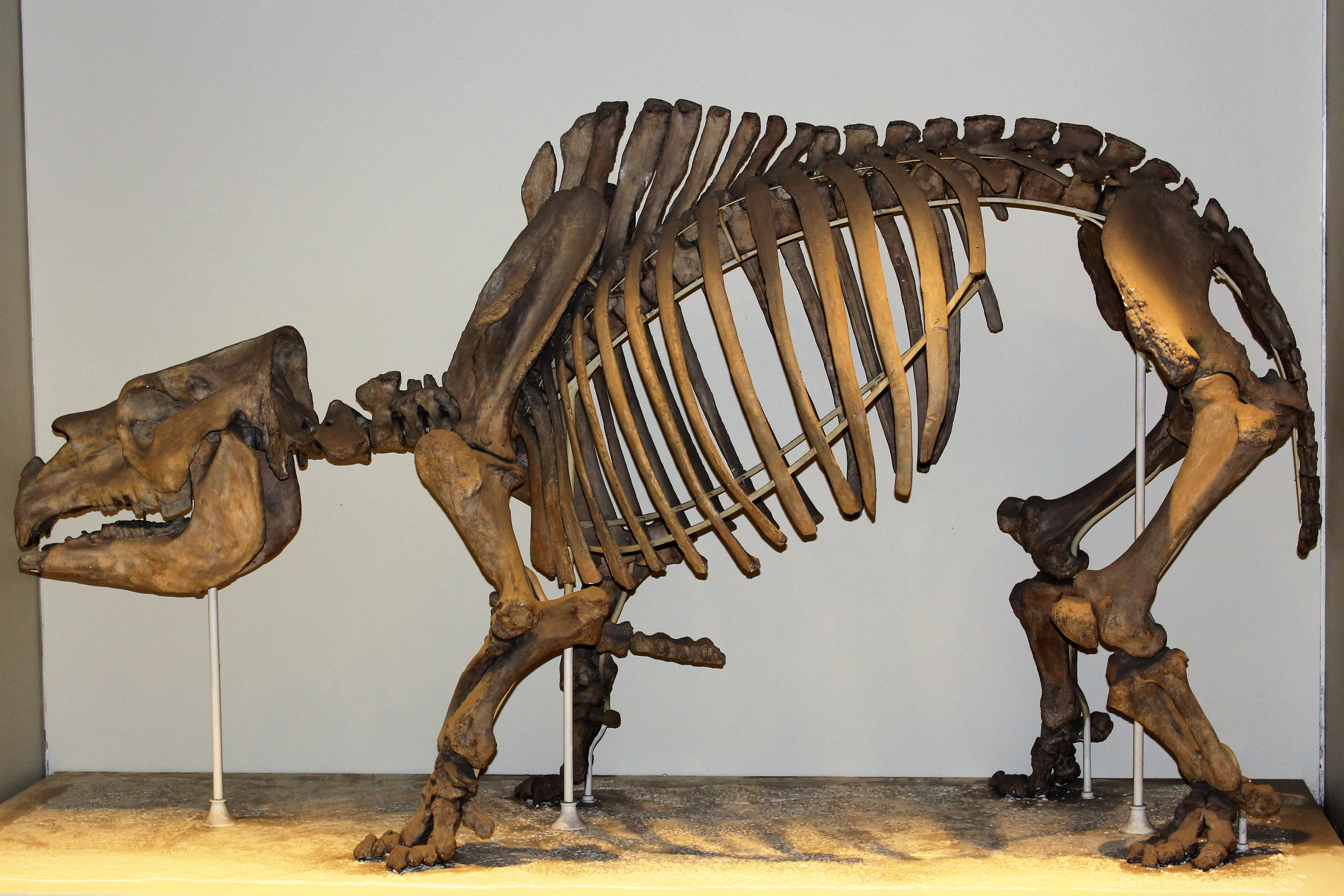
- Toxodon platensis
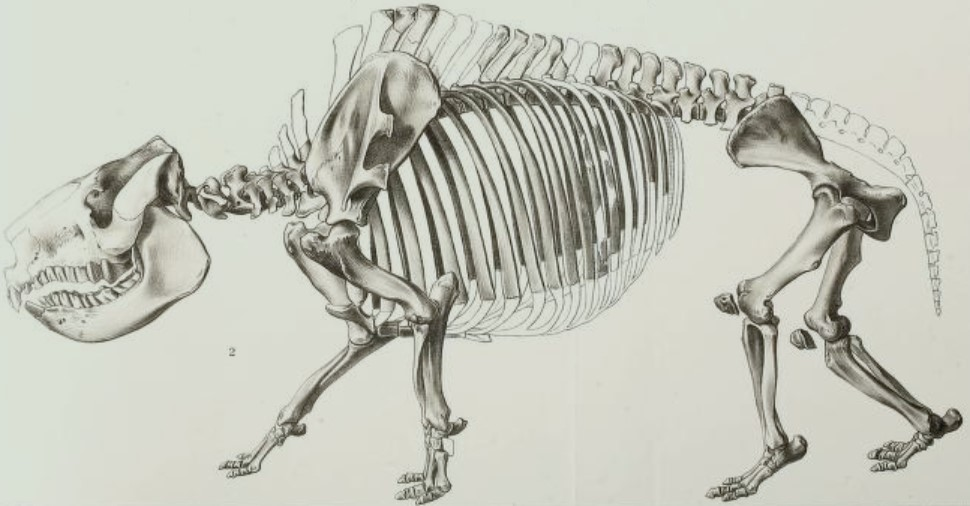
- Skeleton of Nesodon imbricatus

Scientific classification
- Kingdom: Animalia
- Phylum: Chordata
- Class: Mammalia
- Infraclass: Placentalia
- Order: †Notoungulata
- Clade: †Eutoxodontia
- Family: †Toxodontidae; Owen, 1845

Subfamilies and genera
- †Haplodontheriinae: †Abothrodon; †Haplodontherium; †Mesotoxodon; †Ocnerotherium; †Toxodontherium; †Nesodontinae: †Adinotherium; †Nesodon; †Palyeidodon; †Posnanskytherium; †Proadinotherium; †Toxodontinae: †Andinotoxodon; †Ceratoxodon; †Charruatoxodon; †Chapalmalodon; †Dinotoxodon; †Eutomodus; †Falcontoxodon; †Gyrinodon; †Hemixotodon; †Hyperoxotodon; †Mesenodon; †Minitoxodon; †Mixotoxodon; †Neoadinotherium; †Neotoxodon; †Nesodonopsis; †Nonotherium; †Paratrigodon; †Pericotoxodon; †Piauhytherium; †Pisanodon; †Plesiotoxodon; †Prototrigodon; †Stenotephanos; †Stereotoxodon; †Toxodon; †Trigodon; †Trigodonops; †Xotodon

= Toxodontidae =

Toxodontidae Temporal range: Late Oligocene-Holocene (Deseadan-Lujanian) ~27–0.011 Ma

Extinct family of notoungulate mammals

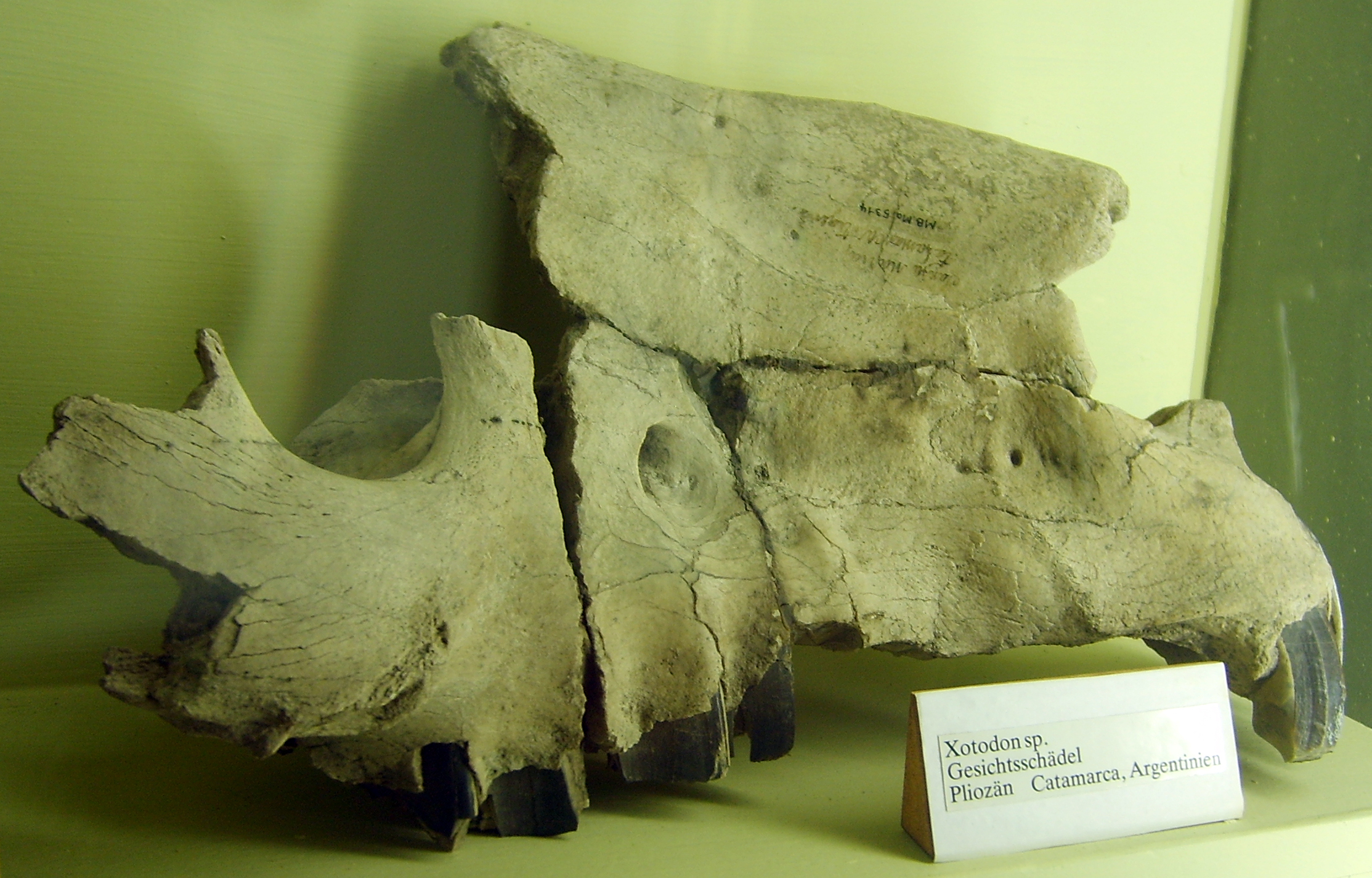
Xotodon sp. skull at the Museum für Naturkunde, Berlin

Toxodontidae (from Ancient Greek τόξον (tóxon), meaning "bow", and ὀδούς (odoús), meaning "tooth") is an extinct family of notoungulate mammals, known from the Oligocene to the Holocene (11,000 BP) of South America, with one genus, Mixotoxodon, also known from the Pleistocene of Central America and southern North America (as far north as Texas). Member of the family were medium to large-sized, ranging from around 350–400 kilograms (770–880 lb) in Nesodon to 1,000–1,200 kilograms (2,200–2,600 lb) in Toxodon, and had medium to high-crowned dentition, which in derived members of the group evolved into ever-growing cheek teeth.

== Palaeobiology ==
=== Palaeoecology ===
Isotopic analyses have led to the conclusion that Pleistocene members of the family were flexible mixed feeders (both browsing and grazing). The family's dietary ecology shifted over time; δ^{13}C ratios show them being mainly browsers in the Miocene and becoming increasingly grazing animals during the Pliocene and especially the Pleistocene epochs.

== Taxonomy ==
The endemic notoungulate and litoptern ungulates of South America have been shown by studies of collagen and mitochondrial DNA sequences to be a sister group to the perissodactyls.

In 2014, a study identifying a new species of toxodontid resolved the families' phylogenetic relations. The below cladogram was found by the study:

- - Pampahippus arenalesi
  - - - Rhynchippus spp.
      - - Scarrittia canquelensis
        - Leonitinia gaudri
    - Toxodontidae
      - Proadinotherium leptognathum
      - - - Adinotherium spp.
          - - Nesodon taweretus
            - Nesodon imbricatus
        - - Palyeidodon obtusum
          - - Hyperoxotodon speciosus
            - - - Nonotherium henningi
                - Xotodon spp.
              - - - Andinotoxodon bolivariensis
                  - - - Dinotoxodon paranensis
                      - Toxodon platensis
                    - - Gyrinodon quassus
                      - - Ocnerotherium intermedium
                        - Hoffstetterius imperator
                - - Posnanskytherium desaguaderoi
                  - - Pisanodon nazari
                    - - Pericotoxodon platignathus
                      - - - Calchaquitherium mixtum
                          - Mixotoxodon larensis
                        - - Paratrigodon euguii
                          - Trigodon gaudri

Cladogram after Armella and Deforel (2026):

- Toxodontidae
  - - Proadinotherium
    - Adinotherium
  - - Nesodon
    - - Hyperotoxodon
      - - Palyeiodon
        - - Pericotoxodon
          - - Xotodontinae
              - Xotodon major
              - - Hemitoxodon
                - - Xotodon prominens
                  - - Xotodon cristatus
                    - - Xotodon caravela
                      - Nonotherium
            - - Altiplaniinae
                Posnanskytherium
              - - "Adinotoxodon altiplanensis"
                - - Calchaquitherium
                  - - Haplodontheriinae
                      - Ocnerotherium
                      - - Hoffstetterius
                        - - Paratrigodon
                          - Trigodon
                    - - Mixodontinae
                        - Mixotoxodon
                        - - Piauhytherium
                          - Falcontoxodon
                      - Toxodontinae
                        - Charrruatoxodon
                        - - Toxodon
                          - - Dinotoxodon
                            - Gyrinodon
