= Gyrinodon =

Gyrinodon Temporal range: Late Miocene-Early Pliocene ~7–4 Ma

Scientific classification
- Domain: Eukaryota
- Kingdom: Animalia
- Phylum: Chordata
- Class: Mammalia
- Order: †Notoungulata
- Family: †Toxodontidae
- Subfamily: †Toxodontinae
- Genus: †Gyrinodon; Hopwood, 1928

Type species
- †Gyrinodon quassus Hopwood, 1928

Species
- G. quassus Hopwood 1928

Extinct genus of notoungulates

Gyrinodon is an extinct genus of toxodontid notoungulate that lived from the Late Miocene and Early Pliocene in what is now Brazil and Colombia.

== Description ==
This animal was approximately the size of a modern rhinoceros, and they were similar in build as in appearance. Like most of its close relatives, Gyrinodon's size was substantially larger than any other mammal in its habitat. The frontal region of the skull passed softly into the anterior portion of the temporal fossa. The postorbital processes were reduced. Unlike some of its relatives, neither the upper edge of the orbit nor the roof of the nasal cavity were swollen. The lateral upper incisors were curved, and formed an arch of 180° or more. The first two upper molars had a small metaloph, while the third molar had a long and concave ectoloph, but was devoid of metaloph. The symphysis of the mandible did not exceed the second lower molar. The third lower molar lacked a second posterior crease in the enamel of the lingual surface.

== Classification ==
Gyrinodon quassus was first described by Hopwood in 1928, based on fossils found in Early Pliocene terrains of Venezuela. Other fossils attributed to the species were later found in Brazil in terrains dated from the Late Miocene, and remains attributed to Gyrinodon were also discovered in the Urumaco Formation of Venezuela.

Gyrinodon was a member of the Toxodontidae, a family of well-known notoungulates with heavy and large shapes. Gyrinodon may have been a rather derived form, forming a clade with its relatives Falcontoxodon, Mixotoxodon, and Piauhytherium.

== Bibliography ==
- A. T. Hopwood. 1928. Gyrinodon quassus, a new genus and species of toxodont from Western Buchivacoa (Venezuela). Quarterly Journal of the Geological Society 84:573-583
- O. J. Linares. 2004. Bioestratigrafia de la fauna de mamíferos de las Formaciones Socorro, Urumaco y Codore (Mioceno medio - Plioceno temprno)de la región de Urumaco, Falcon, Venezuela. Paleobiologia Neotropical 1:1-26
- M. A. Cozzuol. 2006. The Acre vertebrate fauna: Age, diversity, and geography. Journal of South American Earth Sciences 21:185-203
