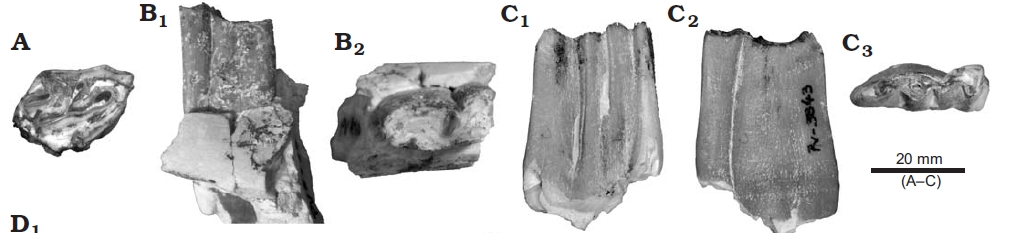
- Proadinotherium fossils

Scientific classification
- Kingdom: Animalia
- Phylum: Chordata
- Class: Mammalia
- Order: †Notoungulata
- Family: †Toxodontidae
- Subfamily: †Nesodontinae
- Genus: †Proadinotherium; Ameghino, 1894

Type species
- †Proadinotherium leptognathum Ameghino, 1894

Species
- P. angustidens Ameghino 1897; P. leptognathum Ameghino 1894; P. muensteri Ameghino 1902; P. saltoni Shockey & Anaya 2008

= Proadinotherium =

Proadinotherium Temporal range: Late Oligocene-Early Miocene ~27–17.5 Ma

Extinct genus of notoungulates

Proadinotherium is an extinct genus of toxodontid. It lived between the Late Oligocene and the Early Miocene in what is now South America.

== Description ==
This genus is only known from very partial remains. From the comparison with its relatives Adinotherium and Nesodon, it is supposed that Adinotherium was an herbivorous animal the size of a sheep, with an elongated body and rather short legs; it was probably more slender-built than the two latter forms. The legs, in particular, had more delicate and slender bones than those of Adinotherium and Nesodon. Proadinotherium was characterized by its teeth with a lower crown, less hypsodont than those of Adinotherium, but evocating more derived toxodontids. Its dentition was complete with a complex structure, and the development of a crest on the molars.

== Classification ==
Proadinotherium is considered to be the most basal and oldest member of the Toxodontidae, the most specialized group of the notoungulates, which included the well known Pleistocene genus Toxodon, as well as a number of Miocene and Pliocene forms.

The genus Proadinotherium was first described in 1894 by Florentino Ameghino, based on fossil remains found in Argentine Patagonia, with the type species being Proadinotherium leptognathum, known from various remains from the Santa Cruz Province and Chubut Province. Ameghino described several other species, from more recent Early Miocene deposits of Patagonia, such as P. angustidens and P. muensteri. Another species, P. saltoni, was discovered in the Salla Formation in Bolivia. Other remains attributed to the genus have been found in the Tremembé Formation of Brazil, the Chaparral Formation of Colombia, and the Agua de la Piedra and Cerro Bandera Formations of Mendoza and Neuquén Provinces of Argentina.
