= Paratrigodon =

Paratrigodon Temporal range: Early Miocene-Late Miocene (Laventan-Chasicoan) ~13.8–7.246 Ma

Scientific classification
- Kingdom: Animalia
- Phylum: Chordata
- Class: Mammalia
- Order: †Notoungulata
- Family: †Toxodontidae
- Genus: †Paratrigodon; Cabrera & Kraglievich, 1931
- Species: †P. euguii

Binomial name
- †Paratrigodon euguii Cabrera & Kraglievich, 1931

Extinct genus of mammals

Paratrigodon is an extinct genus notoungulate belonging to the subfamily Toxodontinae, containing one species, P. euguii. Like its close relative Trigodon, it is known for the presence of a horn-like protuberance on its forehead. Fossils of Paratrigodon are known from the Arroyo Chasicó Formation dating from the Chasicoan period, and teeth from the Laventan-aged Quebrada Honda Fauna of Bolivia were also associated with the genus, although considered too different from the type species to be assigned to it.

== Description ==
Paratrigodon was originally described in 1931 from remains coming from the Arroyo Chasicó Formation of Argentina. The holotype, MLP 12-1664 preserved the basis and the rostral part of the crania of an adult specimen, including the zygomatic bone. The skull was larger than Trigodon, with an enlarged rostral part and broad incisors, similar to Toxodon, and a strong protuberance on its forehead. It is different from most toxodonts by having upper molars with a single non-bifurcating enamel fold and a smooth distlingual sulcus. Its species name honors Bernardo Eugui, a member of the paleontology department of the La Plata Museum, who recovered most of the material assigned to the holotype.

It is closely related to other toxodonts like Trigodon, Toxodon, and Adinotherium.

Its name means "near Trigodon" because of its resemblance to Trigodon.
