= Pericotoxodon =

Pericotoxodon Temporal range: Middle Miocene (Laventan) ~13.8–11.8 Ma

Scientific classification
- Domain: Eukaryota
- Kingdom: Animalia
- Phylum: Chordata
- Class: Mammalia
- Order: †Notoungulata
- Family: †Toxodontidae
- Genus: †Pericotoxodon; Madden 1997
- Species: †P. platignathus

Binomial name
- †Pericotoxodon platignathus Madden, 1997

Extinct genus of notoungulates

Pericotoxodon is an extinct genus of toxodontid notoungulate, from the Miocene period. Fossils of Pericotoxodon were found near Río Inuya and Mapuya in Peru, and in La Venta, Colombia and Bolivia, in deposits dated to the Middle Miocene.

== Etymology ==
The genus name, Pericotoxodon, is derived from "Perico", which was named after José Espíritu Pericó, who discovered the holotype in the La Gaviota locality from the Villavieja Formation of Colombia.
