= Pisanodon =

Pisanodon Temporal range: Miocene

Scientific classification
- Domain: Eukaryota
- Kingdom: Animalia
- Phylum: Chordata
- Class: Mammalia
- Order: †Notoungulata
- Family: †Toxodontidae
- Genus: †Pisanodon; Zetti, 1972
- Species: †P. nazari

Binomial name
- †Pisanodon nazari Cabrera & Kraglievich, 1931

Extinct genus of notoungulates

Pisanodon is an extinct genus of South American toxodont. The genus contains the single species Pisanodon nazari.
