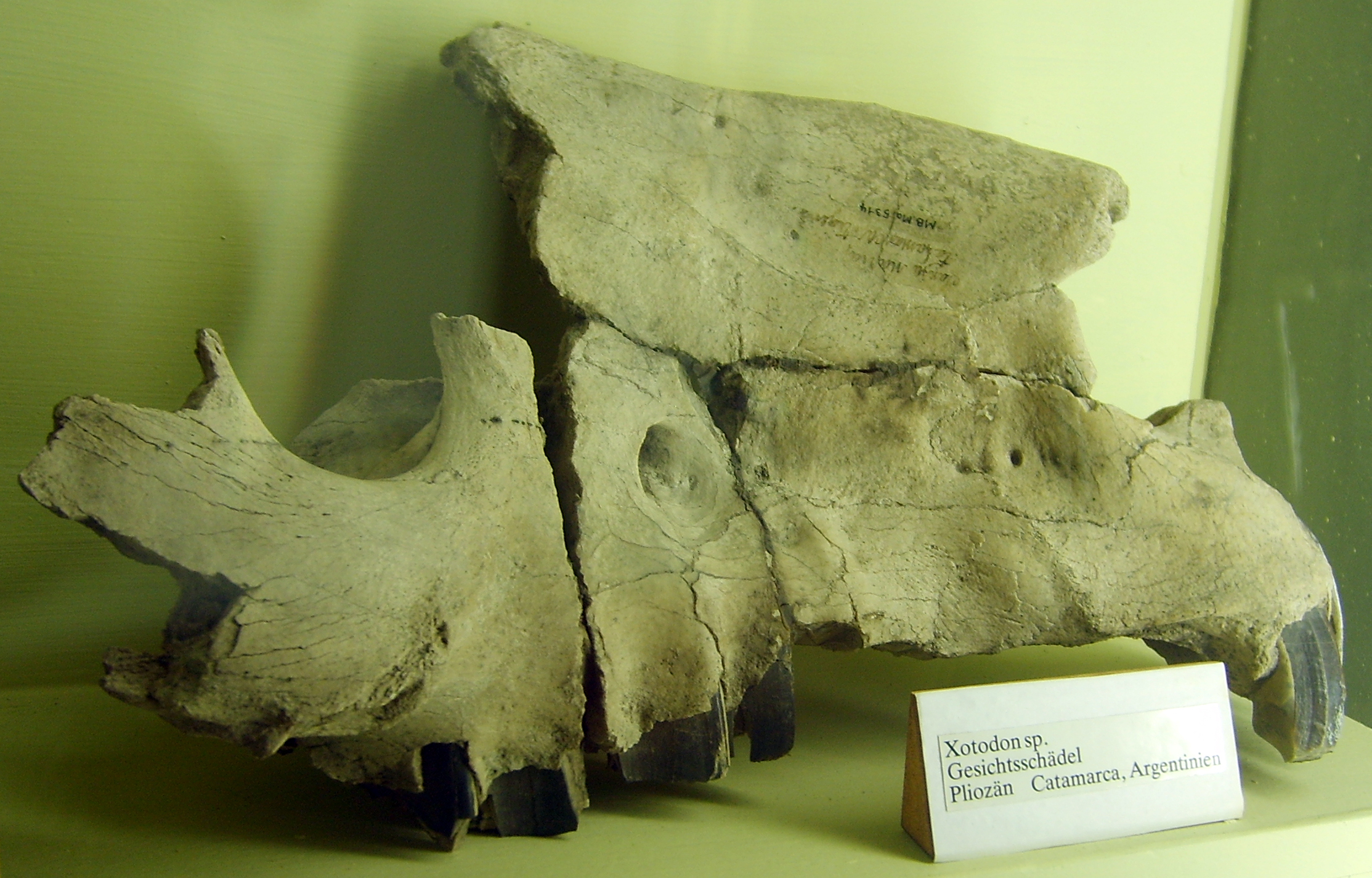
- Xotodon sp. skull at the Museum für Naturkunde, Berlin

Scientific classification
- Kingdom: Animalia
- Phylum: Chordata
- Class: Mammalia
- Order: †Notoungulata
- Family: †Toxodontidae
- Subfamily: †Toxodontinae
- Genus: †Xotodon; Ameghino, 1887

Type species
- †Xotodon foricurvatus (Ameghino, 1885)

Other species
- †X. ambrosetti Rovereto, 1914; †X. caravela Armella & colleagues, 2018; †X. cristatus (Moreno and Mercerat), 1891; †X. doellojuradoi Frenguelli, 1920; †X. maimarensis Bonini & colleagues, 2017; †X. major Rovereto, 1914; †X. prominens Ameghino, 1888

= Xotodon =

Xotodon Temporal range: Miocene (late Miocene), 9.0–6.8 Ma

Extinct genus of mammals

Xotodon is an extinct genus of toxodontid mammal that lived during the Late Miocene (Huayquerian in the SALMA classification) in Argentina, South America. Fossils of Xotodon have been found in the Ituzaingó, Maimará and Chiquimil Formations of Argentina.

== Palaeobiology ==
=== Diet ===
The δ^{13}C ratios of Xotodon suggest they were mixed feeders that consumed a range of both C_{3} and C_{4} plants.
