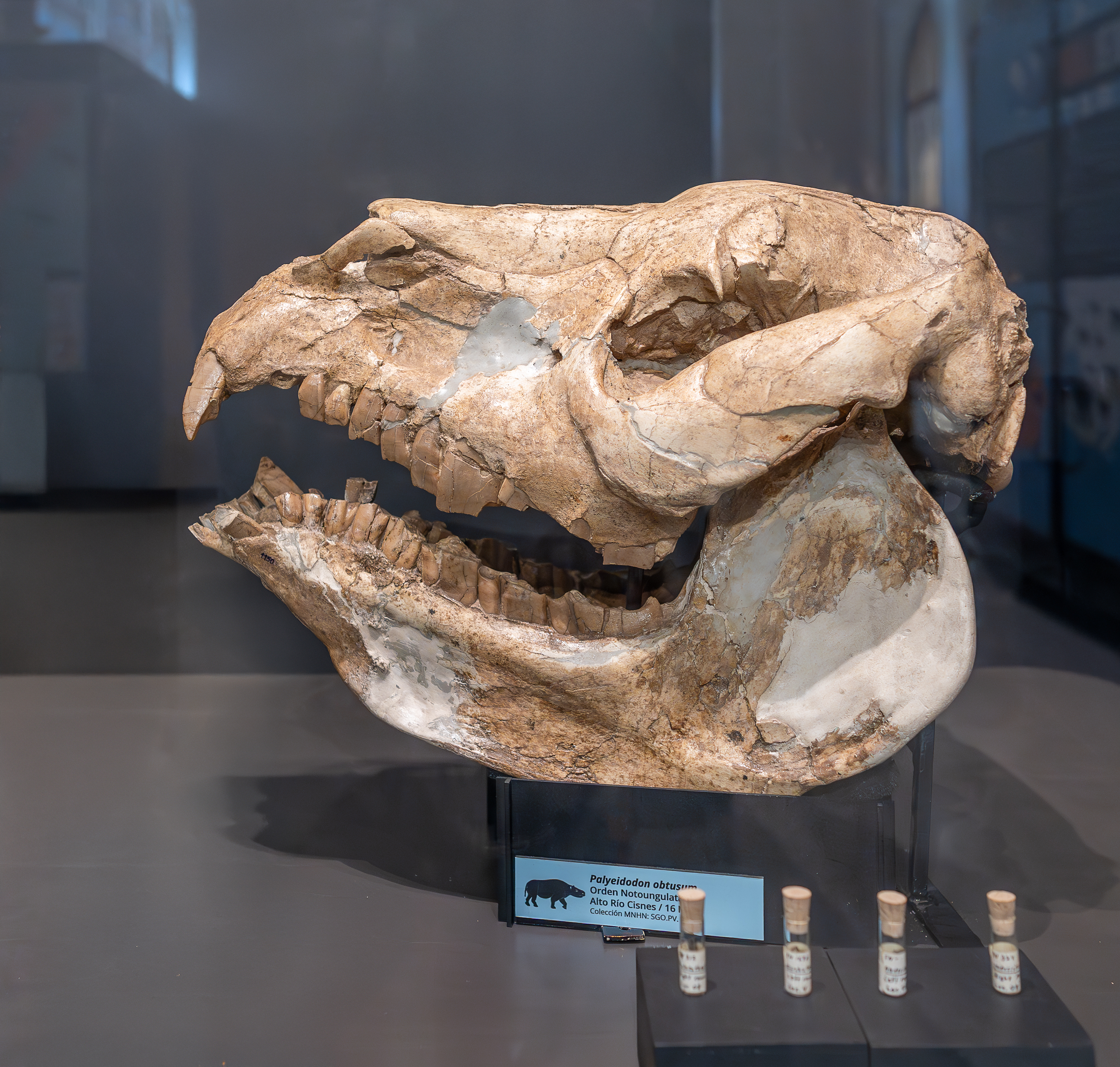
- Skull in Museo Nacional de Historia Natural de Chile

Scientific classification
- Kingdom: Animalia
- Phylum: Chordata
- Class: Mammalia
- Order: †Notoungulata
- Family: †Toxodontidae
- Genus: †Palyeidodon; Roth, 1898
- Species: †P. obtusum

Binomial name
- †Palyeidodon obtusum Roth, 1898

= Palyeidodon =

Palyeidodon Temporal range: Miocene

Extinct genus of notoungulates

Palyeidodon is an extinct genus of mammal belonging to the family Toxodontidae, from the Miocene of Argentina. It contains the single species Palyeidodon obtusum.
