= Nonotherium =

Nonotherium Temporal range: Early Pliocene-Middle Pliocene (Montehermosan-Chapadmalalan) ~5.3–4 Ma

Scientific classification
- Domain: Eukaryota
- Kingdom: Animalia
- Phylum: Chordata
- Class: Mammalia
- Order: †Notoungulata
- Family: †Toxodontidae
- Genus: †Nonotherium; Castellanos, 1942
- Species: †N. hennigi

Binomial name
- †Nonotherium hennigi Castellanos, 1942

Extinct genus of mammals

Nonotherium is an extinct genus of toxodontine toxodontid from the Montehermosan Brochero Formation of Argentina. It was described by Castellanos in 1942.
