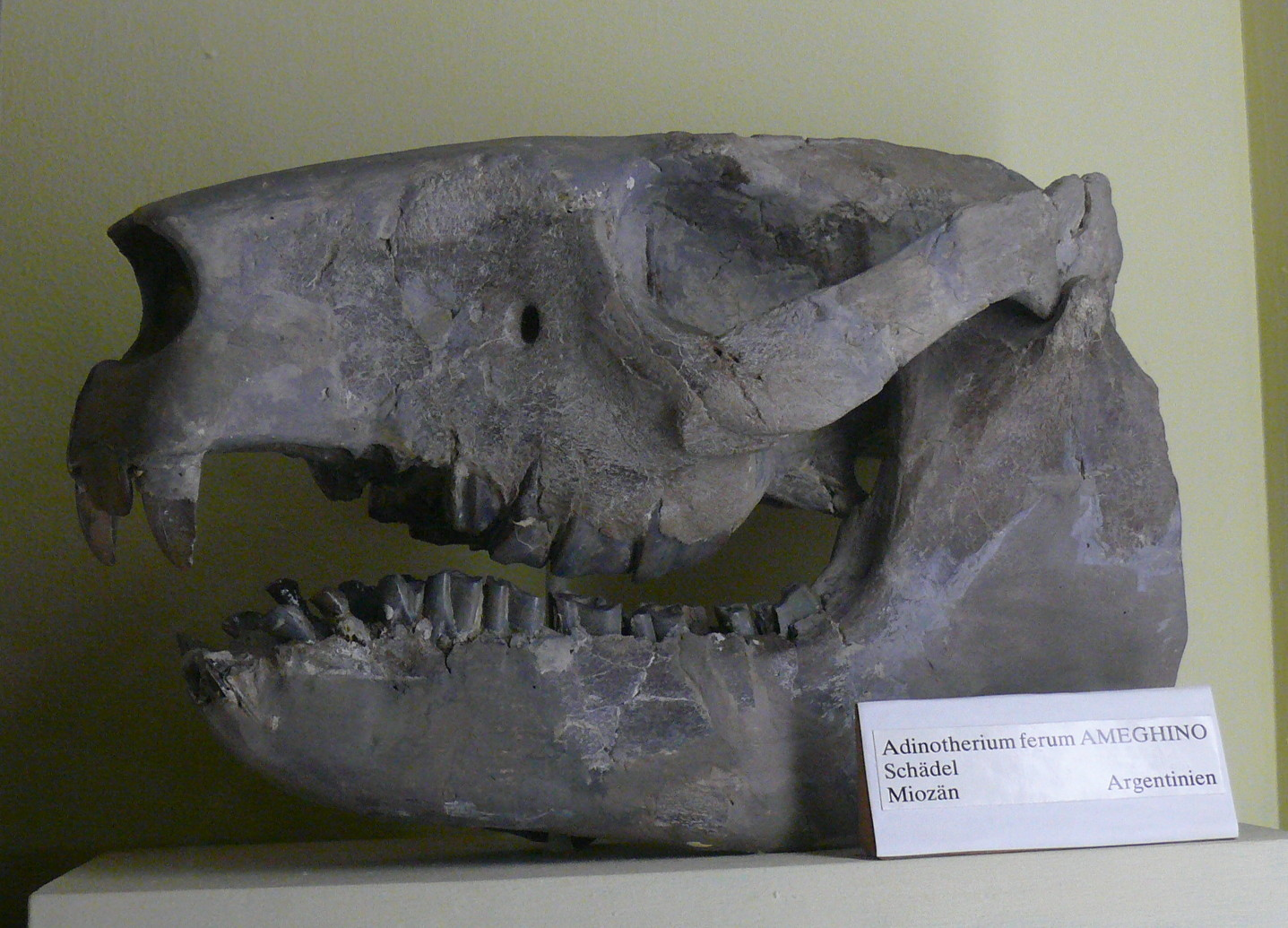
- A. ferum skull at the Museum für Naturkunde, Berlin

Scientific classification
- Kingdom: Animalia
- Phylum: Chordata
- Class: Mammalia
- Order: †Notoungulata
- Family: †Toxodontidae
- Subfamily: †Nesodontinae
- Genus: †Adinotherium; Ameghino 1887

Type species
- †Adinotherium ovinum

Species
- A. corriguenense Ameghino 1907; A. ferum Ameghino 1887; A. haplodontoides Ameghino 1891; A. karaikense; A. nitidum Ameghino 1887; A. ovinum (Owen 1846); A. robustum Ameghino 1891; A. splendidum

Synonyms
- Phobereotherium Ameghino 1887; Noadinotherium Ameghino 1907

= Adinotherium =

Adinotherium Temporal range: Mid-Late Miocene (Santacrucian-Huayquerian) ~17.5–6.8 Ma

Extinct genus of mammals

Adinotherium (meaning "not terrible beast") is an extinct genus of toxodontid, large bodied hoofed ungulates which inhabited South America during the Middle to Late Miocene, from 17.5 to 6.8 Ma and existed for approximately 10.7 million years, Santacrucian to Huayquerian in the South American land mammal ages (SALMA). Fossils of Adinotherium have been found in the Santa Cruz and Ituzaingó Formations of Argentina and the Chucal and Río Frías Formations of Chile.

== Description ==
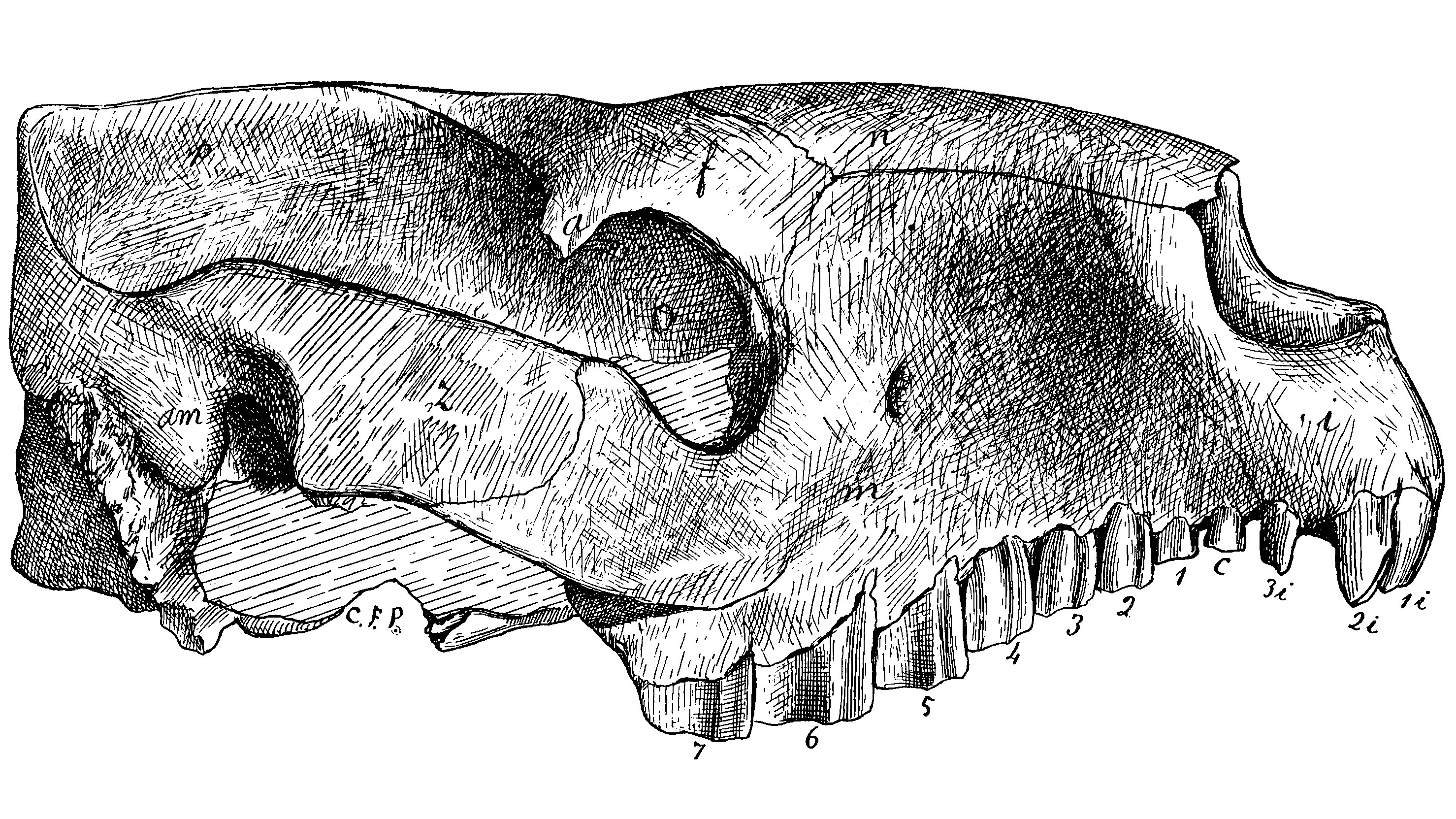
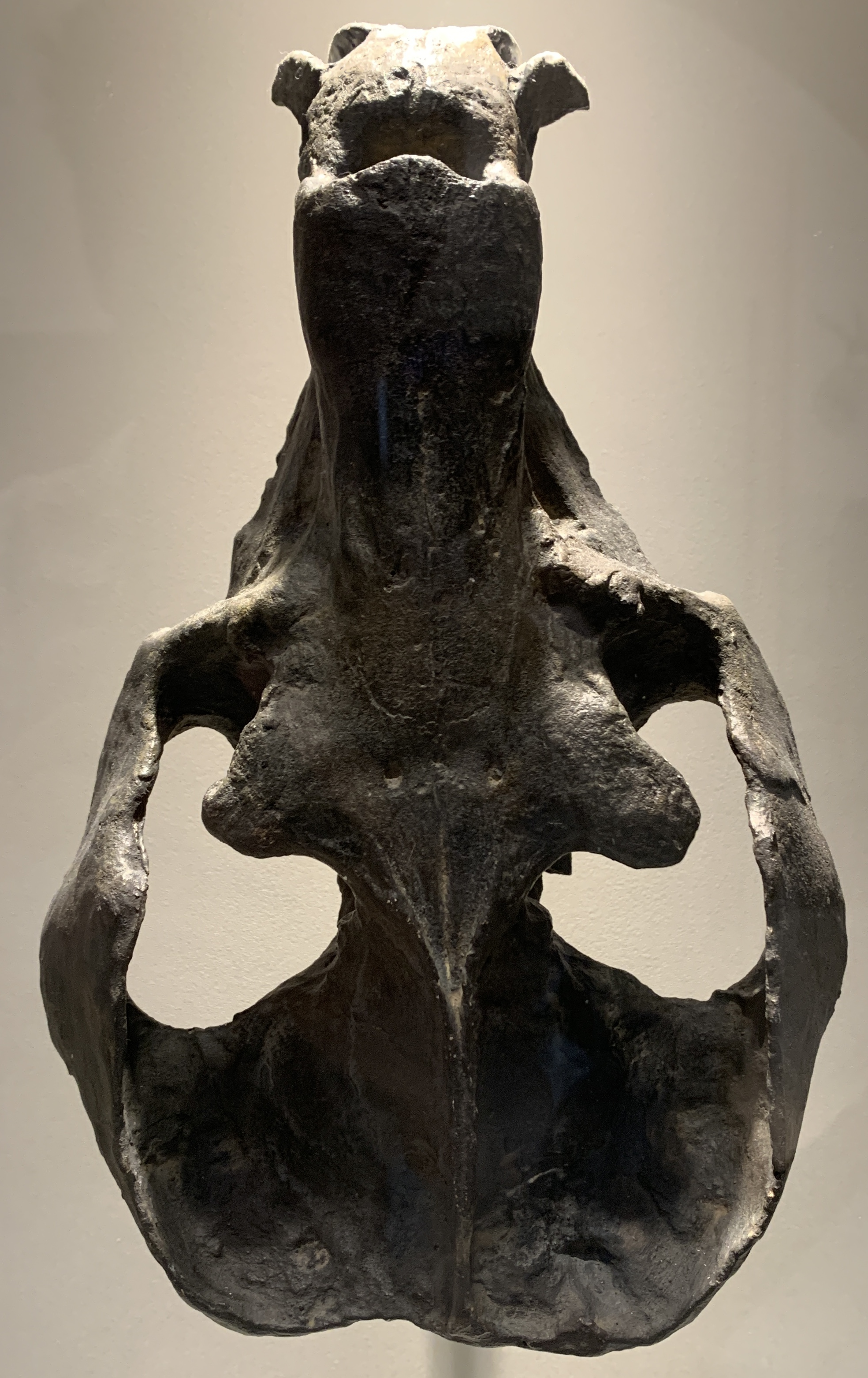
A. ovinum skull, right lateral and dorsal view

The approximately 1.5 metres (4.9 ft) long animal, with an estimated 120 kilograms (260 lb) body mass, looked like a smaller version of its rhinoceros-like relative Toxodon. Its front legs were somewhat longer than those of its relatives, making its hip and shoulder height about equal. A small horn atop Adinotherium's skull may have played a role in the mating season.

== Palaeobiology ==
=== Life cycle ===
The fractal complexity of the enamel crests and the occlusal surface tooth area of A. ovinum teeth from the second premolar to the third molar both varied with age, making both of them useful tools for age estimation in this species and other toxodontids. Enamel crest complexity decreased as the animal matured due to wear, while the area of the tooth's occlusal surface was greater in adults than juveniles due to a combination of both wear and increase in overall size of the teeth of adults.

=== Palaeoecology ===
Adinotherium had highly hypsodont dentition, which may have been an adaptation for grazing on grasses, habitats heavily featuring which were spreading throughout South America at the time Adinotherium was extant. Dental microwear, however, shows that Adinotherium was predominantly a browser.

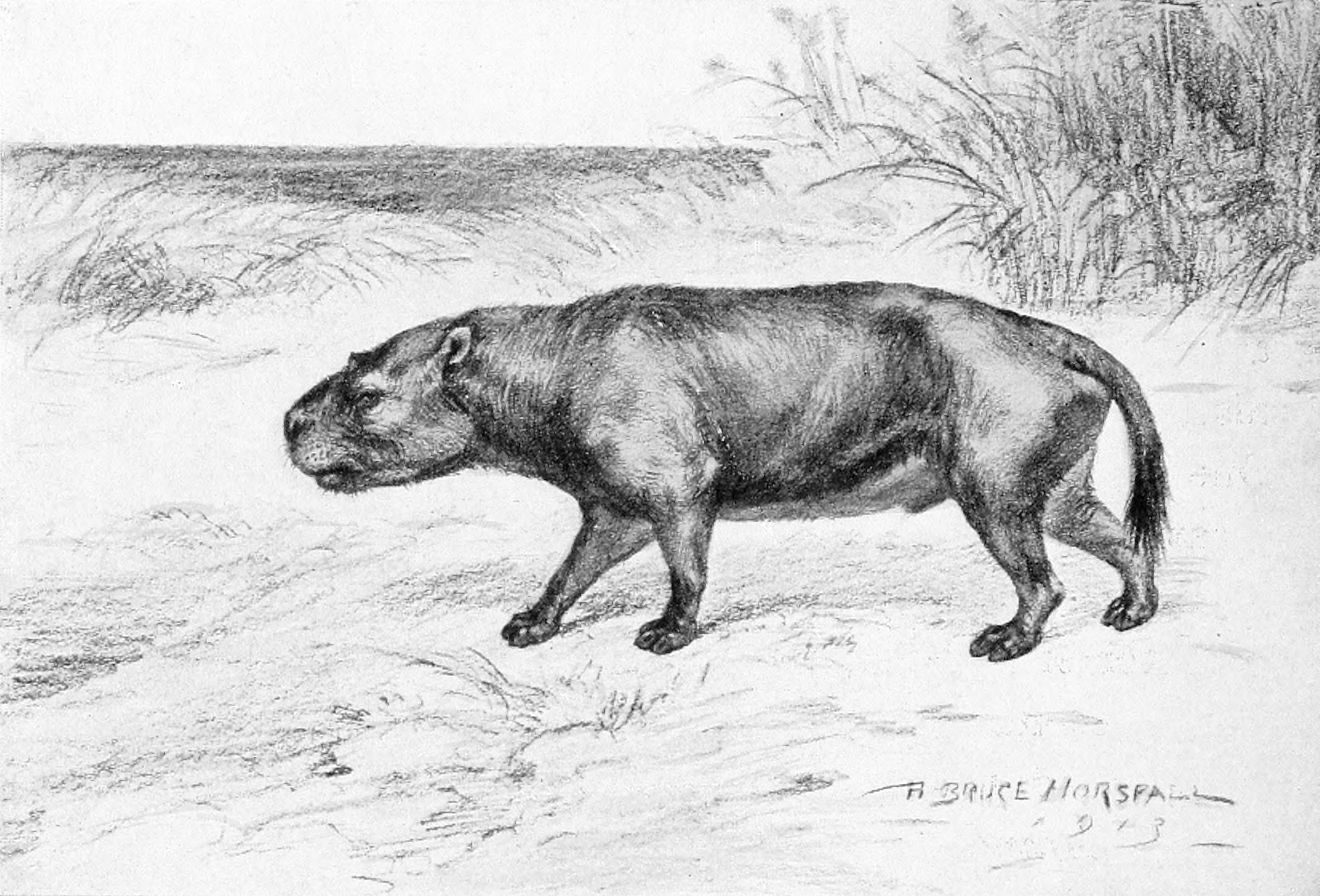
1813 A. ovinum illustration.
