= Maizotemnus =

Maizotemnus Temporal range: Late Paleocene or Early Eocene - 56 Ma

Scientific classification
- Kingdom: Animalia
- Phylum: Chordata
- Class: Mammalia
- Order: †Notoungulata
- Family: †Isotemnidae
- Genus: †Maizotemnus; Fernández et al., 2025

Type species
- †Maizotemnus archaeios Fernández et al., 2025

Extinct genus of notoungulates

Maizotemnus is an extinct genus of toxodont notoungulate from the Salta Province of what is today northwestern Argentina. The type and only species is M. archaeios. The genus is the oldest known member of Toxodontia.

== Discovery and naming ==
The holotype, and only specimen of Maizotemnus (given the specimen number IBIGEO-P 143) was discovered in the uppermost part of the Maíz Gordo Formation near the town of Seclantás. The genus name is a reference to the formation in which it was discovered combined with the suffix "-temnus" (derived from the Ancient Greek "témnō" or "τέμνω") which means "to cut" or "to divide". This suffix is commonly used for various toxodonts and is a reference to a groove present on the animals' molars. The species epithet comes from the Ancient Greek word "archē" (ἀρχή) with the adjectival suffix "-ios", roughly meaning "ancient", in reference to its status as the oldest toxodont known at the time of its discovery.

== Description ==
The holotype of Maizotemnus is a relatively incomplete skull. It includes a partial right maxilla with several teeth, one of the left cheek teeth, and five fragments of the mandible. Some of these fragments are not included within the holotype, but the authors do not specify which exact bones are part of the holotype and which are referred.

Maizotemnus was a relatively small toxodont. Although the remains are incomplete, Fernández and colleagues constructed an estimate of the animal's full size using multiple methods based on closely-related taxa. They published two estimates of its size: 19.85 kg (43.8 lb) or 26.73 kg (58.9 lb). These were based on the size of the teeth based on close relatives. Other methods of estimation based on less closely-related taxa produced much wider estimates—between 8–71 kg (18–157 lb)—but the authors did not consider these results to be very likely. The fragmentary nature of the remains led the authors to regard all the estimates they published as tentative and precise estimates would be impossible until the discovery of more fossils of this taxon.

The diagnosis of Maizotemnus from its close relatives is based mostly on the anatomy of the molars. The molars are longer on the mesio-distal axis (from the front to back of the mouth) than those of its close relatives. They also have very low crowns relative to other primitive toxodonts. The molars are also more subtriangular in shape and are wider than they are long. The groove on the teeth is also more shallow than it is in other isotemnids. The degree of wear on the teeth suggest that the holotype individual was an adult when it died.

== Classification ==
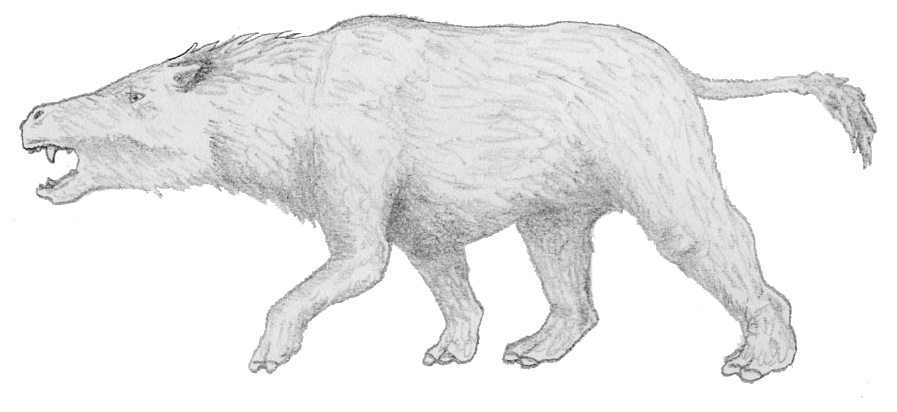
Life restoration of Thomashuxleya, a primitive toxodont and a possible close relative of Maizotemnus

In their description of Maizotemnus, Fernández and colleagues conducted a phylogenetic analysis. Their analysis recovered affinities between Maizotemnus and "isotemnids", which are generally early-diverging toxodonts. However, their analysis failed to recover Isotemnidae as monophyletic. They did find a close relationship between Maizotemnus and the genera Anisotemnus and Pampatemnus, which were the primary taxa used to produce estimates of its body mass. An abbreviated version of the cladogram published by Fernández and colleagues is shown below.

- Toxodontia
  - Isotemnus
  - Pleurostylodon
  - - Distylophorus
    - Rhyphodon
  - - Periphragnis
    - Thomashuxleya
  - Unnamed clade
    - Anisotemnus
    - Maizotemnus
    - Pampatemnus deuteros
    - Pampatemnus infernalis
  - Rest of Toxodontia (monophyletic)
