= Tinguirirican =

Period of geologic time

The Tinguirirican (Spanish: Tinguiririquense) age is a period of geologic time (36.0–29.0 Ma) within the Late Eocene and Early Oligocene epochs of the Paleogene, used more specifically within the SALMA classification in South America. It follows the Divisaderan and precedes the Deseadan age.

== Etymology ==
The age is named after the Tinguiririca fauna of the Abanico Formation in Chile.

== Formations ==
Locations of Tinguirirican formations

Formation bold is type	Country	Basin	Notes
Abanico Formation - Tinguiririca fauna	Chile	Abanico Basin	
Chota Formation	Peru	Bagua Basin	
Entre-Córregos Formation	Brazil	Aiuruoca Basin	
Gualanday Group	Colombia	Central Colombian Ranges	
Laguna Brava Formation	Argentina	Precordillera	
Loreto Formation	Chile	Magallanes Basin	
El Milagro Formation	Peru	Bagua Basin	
Otuma Formation	Peru	Pisco Basin	
Sarmiento Formation	Argentina	Golfo San Jorge Basin	
Seca Formation	Ecuador	Progreso Basin	
Soncco Formation	Peru	Eastern Peruvian Andes	

== Fossils ==
Group	Fossils	Formation	Notes
Mammals	Andemys frassinettii, A. termasi, Archaeotypotherium pattersoni, A. tinguiriricaense, Barrancatatus tinguiririquensis, Bryanpattersonia sulcidens, Chilestylops davidsoni, Eomorphippus bondi, E. neilopdykei, Eomorphippus cf. pascuali, Eoviscaccia frassinettii, Johnbell hatcheri, Klohnia charrieri, Kramadolops abanicoi, K. mckennai, Periphragnis vicentei, Pseudhyrax eutrachytheroides, P. strangulatus, Pseudoglyptodon chilensis, Santiagorothia chiliensis, Termastherium flacoensis, Trigonolophodon cf. elegans, Rhyphodon sp., Astrapotheria indet., ?Borhyaenidae indet., Indaleciinae indet., Notohippidae indet., Tardigrada indet.	Abanico	
Mammals	Baguatherium jaureguii	El Milagro	
Mammals	Colombitherium tolimense	Gualanday	
Mammals	Cynthiacetus peruvianus, Basilosauridae indet.	Otuma	
Mammals	Anisotemnus distentus, Archaeotypotherium propheticus, Barrancatatus maddeni, B. rigidus, Bryanpattersonia sulcidens, Canchadelphys cristata, Clenia brevis, Eomicrobiotherium matutinum, Eomorphippus obscurus, E. pascuali, Eopachyrucos pliciferus, E. pliciformis, Hondonadia praecipitia, H. pumila, Hondonadia cf. fierroensis, Klohnia major, Kramadolops fissuratus, Leontinia ?gaudryi, Machlydotherium ater, Meteutatus percarinatus, Parutaetus chilensis, Peltephilus undulatus, Periakros ambiguus, Pilchenia antiqua, Praedens aberrans, Proargyrohyrax curanderensis, Pseudhyrax ?eutrachytheroides, Pseudoglyptodon cf. chilensis, Rhynchippus pumilus, Rosendolops ebaios, Sadypus minutus, S. aff. confluens, Santiagorothia chiliensis, Archaeutatus sp., Guilielmoscottia sp., Microbiotherium sp., Pleurostylodon sp., Proargyrohyrax sp., Prozaedyus sp., Puelia sp., Glyptatelinae indet., Hathlyacininae indet., Hegetotheriidae indet., Isotemnidae indet., Notohippidae indet., ?Pichipilidae indet., Proterotheriidae indet., Sternbergiidae indet., Stegotheriini indet.	Sarmiento	
Birds	Icadyptes salasi, Inkayacu paracasensis, Spheniscidae indet.	Otuma	
Birds	Gruipeda dominguensis (ichnofossil)	Laguna; Brava	
Reptiles	Pterosphenus sheppardi	Seca	
Fishes	Engraulis sp., Sardinops sp.	Otuma	
Insects	Aiuruocatermes piovezanae, Cenomycetophila mineira	Entre-Corrégos	

== Correlations ==
Tinguirirican correlations in South America
Formation	Abanico	Otuma	El Milagro	Seca	Gualanday	Entre-Córregos	Sarmiento	Map
Basin	Abanico	Pisco	Bagua	Progreso	Central Ranges	Aiuruoca	Golfo San Jorge	Tinguirirican (South America)
Country	Chile	Peru		Ecuador	Colombia	Brazil	Argentina	Tinguirirican (South America)
Archaeotypotherium								Tinguirirican (South America)
Barrancatatus								Tinguirirican (South America)
Bryanpattersonia								Tinguirirican (South America)
Klohnia								Tinguirirican (South America)
Kramadolops								Tinguirirican (South America)
Pseudhyrax								Tinguirirican (South America)
Pseudoglyptodon								Tinguirirican (South America)
Santiagorothia								Tinguirirican (South America)
Pyrotheria								Tinguirirican (South America)
Birds								Tinguirirican (South America)
Reptiles								Tinguirirican (South America)
Fish								Tinguirirican (South America)
Insects								Tinguirirican (South America)
Environments	Alluvial	Shallow marine	Fluvial	Open marine	Alluvial-fluvial	Lacustrine	Fluvio-deltaic	Tinguirirican volcanoclastics Tinguirirican fauna Tinguirirican insects
Volcanic	Yes						Yes	Tinguirirican volcanoclastics Tinguirirican fauna Tinguirirican insects
