= Abanico Formation =

Sedimentary formation in Chile

- Stratigraphic range: Eocene–Miocene (typically Tinguirirican)
- Type: Geological formation
- Underlies: Farellones Formation
- Overlies: Colimapu Formation
- Thickness: ca. 3,000 m (9,800 ft)

Lithology
- Primary: Volcaniclastic sediments comprising basalts, andesites & minor dacites
- Other: Zeolite

Location
- Coordinates: 35.0°S 70.4°W
- Approximate paleocoordinates: 36.9°S 62.6°W
- Region: O'Higgins, Santiago Metropolitan & Valparaíso Regions (Chile); Mendoza Province (Argentina)
- Country: Chile, Argentina
- Extent: Abanico Basin

Type section
- Named for: Cerro El Abanico
- Abanico Formation (Chile)

Abanico Formation (Spanish: Formación Abanico) is a 3 kilometres (9,800 ft) thick sedimentary formation exposed in the Andes of Central Chile. The formation has been deposited in a timespan from the late cretaceous to the Miocene. Abanico Formation's contact with the overlying Miocene Farellones Formation has been the subject of differing interpretations since the 1960s. A small part of the formation crops out in the Mendoza Province of western Argentina.

== Description ==
The sediments accumulated in the Abanico Extensional Basin within a context of the Andean orogeny. The basin had a north–south elongated shape that spanned the latitudes of 29–38° S. Tectonic inversion from 21 to 16 million years ago made the basin collapse and the sediments to be incorporated to the Andean ranges. The northern part of the basin inverted before the southern part. Parts of the formation are known to have experienced Prehnite-pumpellyite facies metamorphism.

== Paleontological significance ==
The Tinguiririca fauna is known from the fossils found in the Abanico Formation near the Tinguiririca River. The rich faunal assemblage of the paleontological site, located in the La Gloria Member and dated at 33 to 31 Ma, gave name to the Tinguirirican South American land mammal age (SALMA), together with the Friasian named after the Río Frías Formation of the Aysén Region, the only ages defined in Chile.

=== Fossil content ===
The following fossils have been recovered from the formation:

SALMA	Group	Fossils	Notes
Colhuehuapian	Mammals	Chilecebus carrascoensis, Notoungulata indet., Rodentia indet.	
Tinguirirican	Mammals	Andemys frassinettii, A. termasi, Archaeotypotherium pattersoni, A. tinguiriricaense, Barrancatatus tinguiririquensis, Bryanpattersonia sulcidens, Chilestylops davidsoni, Rosendo pascuali, Johnbell hatcheri, Klohnia charrieri, Kramadolops abanicoi, K. mckennai, Pseudhyrax eutrachytheroides, P. strangulatus, Pseudoglyptodon chilensis, Santiagorothia chiliensis, Trigonolophodon cf. elegans, Rhyphodon sp., Astrapotheria indet., ?Borhyaenidae indet., Indaleciidae indet., Notohippidae indet., Tardigrada indet.	
Mustersan	Mammals	Ignigena minisculus, aff. Ernestokokenia sp., Borhyaenidae indet., Oldfieldthomasiidae indet.	
Casamayoran	Mammals	Antepithecus brachystephanus	
