= Termastherium =

Termastherium Temporal range: Early Oligocene (Tinguirirican) ~33–29 Ma

Scientific classification
- Domain: Eukaryota
- Kingdom: Animalia
- Phylum: Chordata
- Class: Mammalia
- Order: †Notoungulata
- Family: †Leontiniidae
- Genus: †Termastherium; Wyss, Flynn & Croft 2018
- Species: †T. flacoensis

Binomial name
- †Termastherium flacoensis Wyss, Flynn & Croft, 2018

Extinct genus of notoungulates

Termastherium is an extinct genus of leontiniid notoungulates that lived during the Early Oligocene of what is now Chile. Fossils of this genus have been found in the Oligocene-aged Abanico Formation of Chile.

== Description ==
Termastherium is only known from partial skull remains, and it is difficult to determine its appearance due to the fragmentary nature of these fossils. It is hypothesized, from the comparison with some of its relatives, such as Scarrittia, that Termastherium was approximately the size of a goat, with a more robust build. Termastherium, unlike other leontiniids, was characterized by markedly unilaterally hypsodont upper teeth; premolars and upper molars had a very high crown in the lingual area, and there was a tendency to develop blade-shaped ectolophs, raised above the occlusal surface of the teeth.

== Classification ==
Termastherium flacoensis was first described in 2018, based on fossil remains found in the Abanico Formation, in Chile, in Early Oligocene terrains associated with the Tinguiririca fauna. Termastherium was a member of the family Leontiniidae, a group of notoungulates characterized by their massive builds, which appeared during the Eocene and thrived until the Late Miocene. In the same formation, another similar sized notoungulate, Eomorphippus, was discovered, bearing a bilaterally hypsodont dentition.
