= Casamayoran =

Period of geologic time in the Paleogene

The Casamayoran (Spanish: Casamayorense) age is a period of geologic time (around 48.0–39.0 Ma) within the middle Eocene epoch of the Paleogene, used more specifically within the South American land mammal age (SALMA) classification. It follows the Riochican and precedes the Mustersan age. The Casamayoran is often split into the older Vacan and younger Barrancan subages, which are sometimes considered distinct enough to qualify as SALMAs in their own right.

Several astrapotherian mammals are known from this period, such as Antarctodon and Albertogaudrya from Antarctica and Argentina, respectively. Albertogaudrya and Scaglia were the size of a sheep or a small tapir, hence among the larger mammals in South America at this time.

== Etymology ==
This age is named after the Casamayor Formation of the Golfo San Jorge Basin.

== Formations ==
Locations of Casamayoran formations

Formation bold is type	Country	Basin	Notes
Casamayor Formation	Argentina	Golfo San Jorge Basin	
Abanico Formation	Chile	Abanico Basin	
Bogotá Formation	Colombia	Altiplano Cundiboyacense	
Cayara Formation	Bolivia	Cochabamba Department	
Chota Formation	Peru	Bagua Basin	
Los Cuervos Formation	Colombia	Cesar-Ranchería Basin	
Fonseca Formation	Brazil	Fonseca Basin	
Huitrera Formation	Argentina	Neuquén Basin	
Laguna del Hunco Formation	Argentina	Cañadón Asfalto Basin	
Lumbrera Formation	Argentina	Salta Basin	
Maíz Gordo Formation	Argentina	Salta Basin	
Quebrada de los Colorados Formation	Argentina	Salta Basin	
Sarmiento Formation	Argentina	Golfo San Jorge Basin	

== Fossils ==
Group	Fossils	Formation	Notes
Mammals	Florentinoameghinia mystica, Notopithecus adapinus, Notostylops murinus, Thomashuxleya sp., Trigonostylops sp., cf. Pleurostylodon sp.	Casamayor	
Mammals	Antepithecus brachystephanus	Abanico	
Mammals	cf. Camargomendesia indet.	Cayara	
Mammals	Bonapartherium hinakusijum, Boreastylops lumbrerensis, Callistoe vincei, Campanorco inauguralis, Colbertia lumbrerense, Coquenia bondi, Dolichostylodon saltensis, Griphotherion peiranoi, Indalecia grandensis, Lumbreratherium oblitum, Pampahippus arenalesi, P. secundus, Pampatemnus deuteros, P. infernalis, Patene simpsoni, Prepidolops didelphoides, P. molinai, ?Albertogaudrya carahuasensis, Borhyaenoidea sp.	Lumbrera	
Mammals	Coloradolops cardonensis, Pampahippus powelli, Prostegotherium sp., cf. Utaetus sp., Dasypodidae indet., Leontiniidae indet., Toxodontia indet.	Quebrada de los Colorados	
Mammals	Acropithecus rigidus, Adiantoides magnus, Amphidolops serrula,Anisolambda amel, A. fissidens, Asmithwoodwardia subtrigona, Coona gutierrezi, C. pattersoni, Didolodus minor, Edvardotrouessartia sola, Florentinoameghinia mystica, Henricosbornia lophodonta, Ideodelphys microscopicus, Isotemnus primitivus, Josepholeidya adunca, Maxschlosseria consumata, M. minuta, Notopithecus adapinus, Notostylops appressus, N. pendens, Pleurostylodon similis, Polydolops serra, P. thomasi, Ricardolydekkeria cf. praerupta, Scaglia kraglievichorum, Sparnotheriodon epsilonoides, Thomashuxleya externa, Transpithecus obtentus, Trigonostylops ?wortmani, Homalostylops sp., Patene sp., Albertogaudrya indet., Didolodontidae indet., Prostegotherium indet., Victorlemoinea indet.	Sarmiento	
Birds	Telmabates antiquus, T. howardae	Sarmiento	
Reptiles & amphibians	Loricata indet.	Cayara	
Reptiles & amphibians	Pelomedusoides indet.	Los Cuervos	
Reptiles & amphibians	Llankibatrachus truebae	Huitrera	
Reptiles & amphibians	Shelania pascuali	Laguna del Hunco	
Reptiles & amphibians	Ayllusuchus fernandezi, Lumbrerasaurus scagliai, Sebecus sp., Sebecosuchia indet.	Lumbrera	
Reptiles & amphibians	Crocodylia indet., Testudinata indet.	Quebrada de los Colorados	
Reptiles & amphibians	Chubutophis grandis, Gaffneylania auricularis, Niolamia argentina, Sebecus icaeorhinus, Waincophis australis	Sarmiento	
Fishes	Erythrinidae indet., Serrasalmidae indet., Siluriformes indet.	Cayara	
Fishes	cf. Carcharodon auriculatus, Carcharodon sp.	Casamayor	
Fishes	Bachmannia chubutensis	Laguna del Hunco	
Fishes	Gymnogeophagus eocenicus, Lepidosiren paradoxa, Proterocara argentina	Lumbrera	
Insects	Duartia pulchella, Fonsecablatta patricioi, Fonsecacarabus placidus, Fonsecacicada mineira, Fonsecadalia perfectus, F. propinquus, Fonsecahymen stigmata, Spargotermes costalimai, Auchenorrhyncha indet., Curculionidae indet.	Fonseca	
Insects	Catogenus punctatus, Inacayalestes aikunhuapi	Huitrera	
Molluscs	Gibbula dalli, Jorgechlamys centralis, Ostrea ingens, Pecten proximus, Scalaria rugulosa, Turritella breantania	Casamayor	
Brachiopods	Magellania lenticularis, Plicirhynchia plicigera, Tegulorhynchia squamosa, Terebratella dorsata, T. patagonica	Casamayor	
Echinoids	Hypechinus patagonensis, Iheringiella patagonensis, Isechinus (Toxopneustes) praecursor, Linthia gaudryii, Platypygus (Cyrthoma) posthumus, Psammechinus iheringi, P. tournoueri, Schizaster ameghinoi	Casamayor	
Pollen	Diporisporites elongatus, Gabonisporis vigourouxii, Jussitriporites menendezii, Liquidambarpollenites cf. brandonensis, Podocarpidites cf. marwickii, Retitriletes austroclavatidites, Smilacipites saltensis, Tricolpites lumbrerensis, T. cf. reticulatus, T. vulgaris, Verrustephanoporites simplex, Baculatisporites sp., Diporicellaesporites sp., Inapertisporites sp., Inaperturopollenites sp., Laevigatosporites sp., Nothopollenites sp., Pluricellaesporites sp., Rhoipites sp.	Lumbrera	
