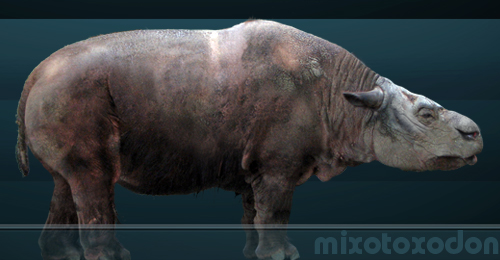
- Mixotoxodon

Scientific classification
- Kingdom: Animalia
- Phylum: Chordata
- Class: Mammalia
- Infraclass: Placentalia
- Order: †Notoungulata
- Suborder: †Toxodontia

Families
- †Homalodotheriidae; †Isotemnidae (paraphyletic); †Eutoxodontia; †Leontiniidae; †Notohippidae (paraphyletic); †Toxodontidae

= Toxodontia =

Toxodontia Temporal range: Paleocene–Holocene

Extinct suborder of mammals

Toxodontia is a suborder of the meridiungulate order Notoungulata. Most of the members of the five included families, including the largest notoungulates, share several dental, auditory and tarsal specializations. The group is named after Toxodon, the first example of the group to be discovered by science.

== Description ==
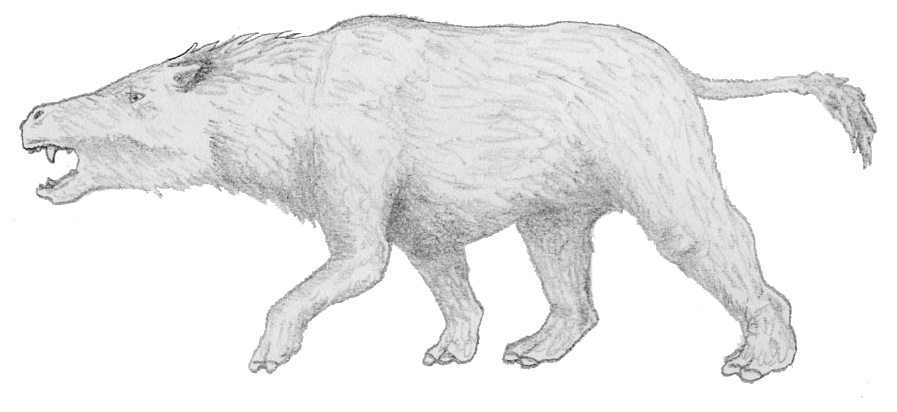
Thomashuxleya reconstruction

Isotemnidae, the oldest and most primitive family of toxodonts, were generally large animals with larger canines than other early notoungulates. The family is probably paraphyletic or polyphyletic since only primitive dental features unite the 12 included genera, such as a complete dentition with unreduced canines and no diastemata in the earliest genera. Likewise, they are only weakly linked to other toxodonts by a few dental features, and their primitive cheek tooth pattern can be basal to all notoungulates except notioprogonians. The oldest of the 12 genera in this family is Isotemnus known from the Riochican-Casamayoran, but other genera are known from the Casamayoran, including Thomashuxleya, Pleurostylodon, and Pampatemnus. Of these, the sheep-sized Thomashuxleya is the best known; its skeleton shows that it was relatively robust, had limbs with reduced distal elongation, and five-hoofed feet with a large central digit.

Notohippidae was also present during the Casamayoran but tend to have more hypsodont cheek teeth than isotemnids. Pampahippus, one of the earliest genera in this family was, nevertheless, low-crowned with densely packed cheek teeth. Its primitiveness is suggested by the retained paraconids on the lower molars. Eomorphippus, a Mustersan notohippid, was moderately hypsodont, Deseadan genera such as Rhynchippus and Eurygenium were very high-crowned, and Santacrucian genera had acquired cementum on the crowns similar to equids.

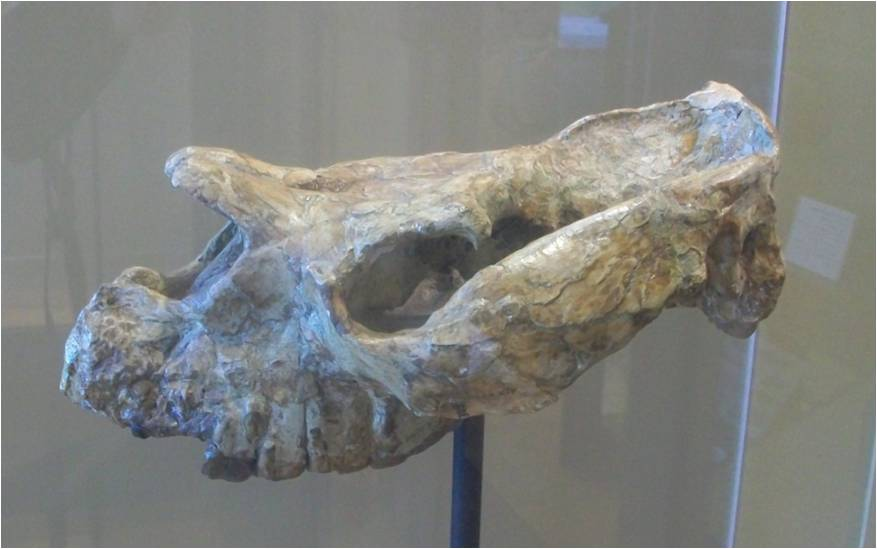
Leontinia gaudryi skull

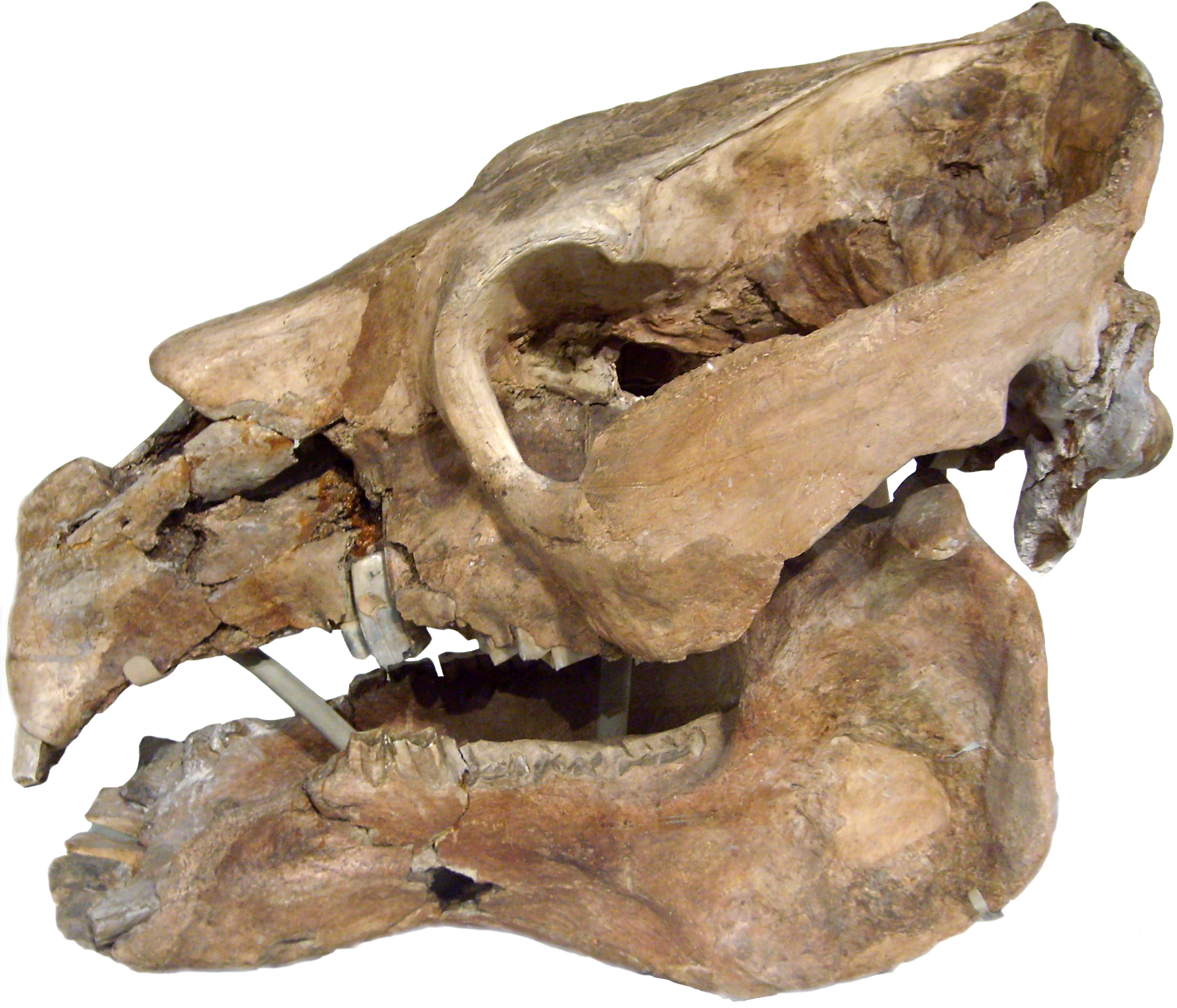
Toxodon skull

The last toxodont family from the early Tertiary are the Leontiniidae. They share several derived tarsal and auditory features with the notohippids and are, together with the Deseadan Toxodontidae, nested within the paraphyletic Notohippidae. Leontiniids are known from the Deseadan or later, but the oldest and most primitive leontiniid, the Mustersan Martinmiguelia, retained a primitive brachydont dentition without diastemata except around the very small canines. Scarrittia, the best-known leontiniid, had mesaxonic (enlarged central digit) feet with reduced lateral digits.

Toxodontids first appeared during the Oligocene in the form of Proadinotherium. Another well-known toxodontid is Nesodon, a medium-sized Miocene toxodontid descended from Proadinotherium which had converted its second upper incisors into tusks. Toxodon itself evolved during the Pliocene alongside the related Trigodon, an equally large mammal which possessed a horn projecting from its forehead, in the same way as a modern rhinoceros. Toxodon was a huge herbivore (about the size of a modern black rhinoceros) with three toes on each foot.
