= Eohyrax =

Eohyrax Temporal range: Middle Eocene ~45–38 Ma

Scientific classification
- Kingdom: Animalia
- Phylum: Chordata
- Class: Mammalia
- Order: †Notoungulata
- Family: †Archaeohyracidae
- Genus: †Eohyrax; Ameghino 1901

Type species
- †Eohyrax rusticus Ameghino, 1901

Species
- E. isotemnoides Ameghino 1904; E. platyodus Ameghino 1904; E. praerusticus Ameghino 1902; E. rusticus Ameghino 1901

Synonyms
- E. brachyodus Ameghino 1902

Extinct genus of mammals

Eohyrax is an extinct genus of notoungulate, belonging to the suborder Typotheria. It lived during the Middle Eocene, and its remains were discovered in South America.

== Description ==
This animal is mostly known from fossils of its dentition, which suggests it was an animal between the size of a racoon and a red fox; it would have looked like a marmot from comparison with its better known relatives, such as Archaeohyrax. It had very high-crowned (hypsodont) teeth in its cheek region.

== Classification ==
The genus Eohyrax was first described in 1901 by Florentino Ameghino, based on fossils found in Late Eocene terrains of Argentina. Ameghino thought the fossils dated from the Late Cretaceous, and this assumption was only corrected much later. Similarly, Ameghino thought that some of the South American mammals he described were the ancestors of the fauna of other continents, and therefore considered Eohyrax as a relative of hyraxes, hence its name, Eohyrax, meaning "Hyrax of the dawn". The real affinities of Eohyrax within Notoungulata were only recognized later, as it was reclassified as a member of the subgroup of rodent-like notoungulates Typotheria. Eohyrax was approached of the genus Archaeohyrax within Archaeohyracidae a family thought to be ancestral to Hegetotheriidae; however, further researches tend to indicate that Archaeohyracidae are a paraphyletic group, and that Eohyrax itself would be a basal member of a clade including Mesotheriidae and Hegetotheriidae.

Various species have been attributed to the genus Eohyrax; after the type species Eohyrax rusticus, Ameghino described E. brachyodus, E. isotemnoides, E. platyodus and E. praerusticus. It is probable that several of these species were in fact identical to the type species.

== Bibliography ==
- F. Ameghino. 1901. Notices préliminaires sur des ongulés nouveaux des terrains crétacés de Patagonie [Preliminary notes on new ungulates from the Cretaceous terrains of Patagonia]. Boletin de la Academia Nacional de Ciencias de Córdoba 16:349-429
- F. Ameghino. 1902. Notices préliminaires sur des mammifères nouveaux des terrains Crétacé de Patagonie {preliminary notes on new mammals from the Cretaceous terrains of Patagonia]. Boletin de la Academia Nacional de Ciencias de Córdoba 17:5-70
- F. Ameghino. 1904. Nuevas especies de mamíferos, cretáceos y terciarios de la República Argentina [New species of mammals, Cretaceous and Tertiarty, from the Argentine Republic]. Anales de la Sociedad Cientifica Argentina 56–58:1-142
- G. G. Simpson. 1967. The beginning of the age of mammals in South America. Part II. Bulletin of the American Museum of Natural History 137:1-260
- G. Billet, B. Patterson, and C. Muizon. 2009. Craniodental anatomy of late Oligocene archaeohyracids (Notoungulata, Mammalia) from Bolivia and Argentina and new phylogenetic hypotheses. Zoological Journal of the Linnean Society 155:458-509
- Billet, Guillaume (2011). "Phylogeny of the Notoungulata (Mammalia) based on cranial and dental characters". Journal of Systematic Palaeontology. 9 (4): 481–97. doi:10.1080/14772019.2010.528456. OCLC 740994816.
