= Punahyrax =

Punahyrax Temporal range: Eocene (Mustersan) ~48–42 Ma

Scientific classification
- Kingdom: Animalia
- Phylum: Chordata
- Class: Mammalia
- Order: †Notoungulata
- Family: †Archaeohyracidae
- Genus: †Punahyrax; Reguero et al, 2008
- Species: †P. bondesioi

Binomial name
- †Punahyrax bondesioi Reguero, Croft, López & Alonso, 2008

Extinct genus of mammals

Punahyrax is an extinct genus of placental mammal belonging to the family Archaeohyracidae, within the order Notoungulata, and endemic of South America.

== Distribution ==
The fossilised remains of Punahyrax were discovered in Argentina, and were found in the Geste Formation, near Antofagasta de la Sierra in the Catamarca Province, and in the Pozuelos Formation in the Salta Province. Those sites are considered to represent a fauna dated from the Mustersan, the South American Late Eocene.

== Etymology ==
The name Punahyrax is composed of the prefix Puna-, the Quechua word designing the central altiplano of the Andes, and who gave its name to the puna grassland ecoregion, and of the suffix -hyrax, commonly used in the taxonomy of Archaeohyracidae. The species name, Punahyrax bondesioi, honors the paleontologist Pedro Bondesio.

== Description ==
Punahyrax was one of the smaller archaeohyracids, approximately 30% smaller than Archaeohyrax. Apart from its size, it was distinguished from its relatives by the absence of the anterolingual cingulum in the upper molars and of the trigonid fossa in the lower molars.

== Holotype ==
The holotype MLP 88-V-10-6 is a fragmentary mandible preserving the second molar, kept in the La Plata Museum, in Argentina.
