= Griphotherion =

Griphotherion Temporal range: Eocene (Casamayoran) ~45.0–41.0 Ma

Scientific classification
- Kingdom: Animalia
- Phylum: Chordata
- Class: Mammalia
- Order: †Notoungulata
- Family: †incertae sedis
- Genus: †Griphotherion; García-López & Powell 2011

Species
- †G. peiranoi García-López & Powell 2011 (type)

Extinct genus of mammals

Griphotherion is an extinct genus of notoungulate mammal from the Eocene of Argentina. A fossil skeleton was found in the Lumbrera Formation and described in 2011 as the holotype of the type species G. peiranoi.

== Description ==
Griphotherion was a small "rodent-like" notoungulate, similar to members of the families Archaeohyracidae, Hegetotheriidae, and Mesotheriidae. It had many unique features that are not seen in other notoungulates, and has therefore not been placed in any notoungulate family.
