= Pseudoglyptodon =

Pseudoglyptodon Temporal range: Middle Eocene-Late Oligocene (Mustersan-Deseadan) ~48–28.4 Ma

Scientific classification
- Domain: Eukaryota
- Kingdom: Animalia
- Phylum: Chordata
- Class: Mammalia
- Order: Pilosa
- Suborder: Folivora
- Genus: †Pseudoglyptodon; Engelmann 1987

Species
- P. chilensis; P. sallaensis (type)

Extinct genus of sloths

Pseudoglyptodon is a genus of extinct sloths from South America. The type species is Pseudoglyptodon sallaensis.

== Description ==
Fossils of the genus have been found in the Mustersan Sarmiento Formation of Argentina, in the Tinguirirican (Late Eocene to Early Oligocene) Abanico Formation in the Tinguiririca valley in the Cordillera Principal of the Chilean Andes and the Deseadan Salla Formation of Bolivia. P.chilensis is known from a damaged skull with mandible and some damaged skull fragments. The species can differentiated from others based on a number of features: it is larger, has thinner teeth and less angled cusps on the molars. The discovery of this species lead researchers to the conclusion that the genus Pseudoglyptodon is the closest relative of the sloths depending on how the word "sloth" is defined.
