= Mustersan =

The Mustersan age is a period of geologic time (circa 38–35 Ma) within the Eocene epoch of the Paleogene, used more specifically within the South American land mammal age (SALMA) classification. It follows the Casamayoran and precedes the Divisaderan or Tinguirirican ages.

== Etymology ==
This age is named after Lake Musters in the Golfo San Jorge Basin.

== Formations ==
Locations of Mustersan formations

Formation bold is type	Country	Basin	Notes
Sarmiento Formation	Argentina	Golfo San Jorge Basin	
Abanico Formation	Chile	Abanico Basin	
Andesitas Huancache Formation	Argentina	Golfo San Jorge Basin	
Chota Formation	Peru	Bagua Basin	
Geste Formation	Argentina	Puna Plateau	
Paracas Formation	Peru	Pisco Basin	
Pozo Formation	Peru	Ucayali Basin	
Soncco Formation	Peru	Eastern Peruvian Andes	
Vaca Mahuida Formation	Argentina	Neuquén Basin	
Ventana Formation	Argentina	Neuquén Basin	
Yahuarango Formation - Santa Rosa fauna	Peru	Ucayali Basin	

== Fossils ==
Group	Fossils	Formation	Notes
Mammals	Antepithecus brachystephanus, Guilielmoscottia plicifera, Kramadolops mayoi, Propyrotherium saxeum, Pseudhyrax eutrachytheroides, Eomorphippus sp.	Sarmiento	
Mammals	Chlorocyon phantasma, Ignigena minisculus, aff. Ernestokokenia sp., Borhyaenidae indet., Oldfieldthomasiidae indet.	Abanico	
Mammals	Archaeopithecus cf. rogeri, Asmithwoodwardia subtrigona, Bardalestes hunco, Gashternia ctalehor, Greniodon sylvaticus, Henricosbornia lophodonta, Homalostylops parvus, Palangania cf. brandmayri, Polydolops rothi, P. unicus, Prostegotherium cf. astrifer, Amphidolops sp., Marmosopsis sp., Notostylops sp., Pauladelphys sp., Protodidelphis sp., Riostegotherium sp., Stegosimpsonia sp., Borhyaeninae indet., Caroloameghiniinae indet., Hathlyacininae indet.	Andesitas; Huancache	
Mammals	Antofagastia turneri, Bonapartherium serrensis, Parastegosimpsonia cf. peruana, Parutaetus punaensis, Prostegotherium notostylopianum, Pucatherium parvum, Punadolops alonsoi, Punahyrax bondesioi, Punapithecus minor, Punatherium catamarquensis, Reigia punae, Suniodon catamarcensis, Astegotherium sp., Callistoe sp., Colbertia sp., cf. Ernestokokenia sp., cf. Pampahippus sp., Propyrotherium sp., cf. Utaetus sp., Astrapotheriidae indet., Interatheriidae indet., Isotemnidae indet., Litopterna indet., Notohippidae indet., Notostylopidae indet., Notoungulata indet., Oldfieldthomasiidae indet., Typotheria indet.	Geste	
Mammals	Eobranisamys riverai, E. romeropittmanae, Eodelphomys almeidacomposi, Eoespina woodi, Eoincamys ameghinoi, E. pascuali, Eopicure kraglievichi, Eopululo wigmorei, Eosachacui lavocati, Eosallamys paulacoutoi, E. simpsoni, Hondonadia pittmanae, Incadolops ucayali, Kirutherium paititiensis, Kiruwamaq chisu, Micoureus laventicus, Parastegosimpsonia peruana, Patene campbelli, Perulestes cardichi, P. fraileyi, Perupithecus ucayaliensis, Rumiodon inti, Sasawatsu mahaynaq, Wamradolops tsullodon, Wirunodon chanku, Yuruatherium tropicalis, Guiomys sp., Scleromys sp., Sipalocyon sp., cf. Microsteiromys sp., Acaremyidae indet., Chiroptera indet., ?Gondwanatheria indet., Glyptodontinae indet., Hystricognatha indet., Interatheriinae indet., cf. Notohippidae indet.	Yahuarango	
Birds	Perudyptes devriesi	Paracas	
Birds	Psilopteridae indet.	Sarmiento	
Birds	Presbyornithidae indet.	Vaca; Mahuida	
Reptiles & amphibians	Boidae indet., Sebecidae indet., Testudines indet.	Geste	
Reptiles & amphibians	Shelania laurenti	Vaca; Mahuida	
Reptiles & amphibians	Boinae indet.	Sarmiento	
Insects	Acanthocephalonotum martinsnetoi, Archimyrmex piatnitzkyi, A. smekali, Madres delpueblo, ?Atalophlebia sp., Stratiomyidae indet.	Ventana	
Flora	Agathis zamunerae, Atherospermophyllum guinazui, Embothrium precoccineum, ?Embothrium pregrandiflorum, Fagus subferruginea, Lomatia preferruginea, Retrophyllum spiralifolium, Blechnum sp.	Ventana	

== See also ==
- Lake Musters
