= Protobradys =

Protobradys armonicus Temporal range: Early Eocene, 50–48 Ma

Scientific classification
- Kingdom: Animalia
- Phylum: Chordata
- Clade: Synapsida
- Clade: Mammaliaformes
- Class: Mammalia
- Genus: †Protobradys; Ameghino, 1902
- Species: †P. armonicus

Binomial name
- †Protobradys armonicus Ameghino, 1902

Extinct genus of mammal

Protobradys ("early slowness") is an extinct genus of mammal of unknown affinities from the Early Eocene (Casamayoran SALMA, around 50–48 mya) of Chubut Province, Argentina. It was described in 1902 by prolific Argentine paleontologist Florentino Ameghino on the basis of an isolated left maxilla (upper jaw bone) and an erroneously referred tooth. Ameghino described the genus as the earliest known member of Pilosa (sloths), though this assessment has not been supported and later authors believe that it is a nomen vanum of uncertain affinities within Mammalia.
