= Hondonadia =

Hondonadia Temporal range: Late Eocene-Early Oligocene (Tinguirirican) ~36–29 Ma

Scientific classification
- Domain: Eukaryota
- Kingdom: Animalia
- Phylum: Chordata
- Class: Mammalia
- Order: †Polydolopimorphia
- Family: †Rosendolopidae
- Genus: †Hondonadia; Goin & Candela, 1998

Type species
- †Hondonadia feruglioi Goin & Candela, 1998

Species
- H. feruglioi Goin & Candela 1998; H. parca Goin et al. 2010; H. pittmanae Goin & Candela 2004; H. praecipitia Goin et al. 2010; H. pumila Goin et al. 2010; H. fierroensis (Flynn & Wyss 1999)
- Hondonadia (South America)

Synonyms
- Pascualdelphys Flynn & Wyss 1999

Extinct genus of marsupials

Hondonadia is an extinct genus of Late Eocene to Early Oligocene (Tinguirirican) marsupials related to today's shrew opossums and with similar features as the related Rosendolops. The type species Hondonadia feruglioi was described by Goin and Candela in 1998. In later years, five more species were recognized, of which Pascualdelphys fierroensis, described by Flynn and Wyss in 1999, that was in 2010 synonymized with Hondonadia.

== Description ==
It was a small animal, with estimates of the body weight of the mammal ranging from 27 to 93.3 grams (0.95 to 3.29 oz). The species H. feruglioi and H. praecipitia were possibly larger. Its main diet probably consisted of seeds rather than insects. The type species Hondonadia feruglioi preserves at least four upper incisors (of which the posteriormost is the smallest), but the presence of five teeth cannot be ruled out. H. feruglioi also preserves a very large, subvertical C1.

== Fossil distribution ==
Fossils of the genus were found in the Tinguiririca fauna of the Abanico Formation of Chile, the Santa Rosa local fauna of the Yahuarango Formation in Amazonian Peru and in the Gran Barranca fauna of the Vera Member pertaining to the Sarmiento Formation in Argentina.
