= Martinmiguelia =

Martinmiguelia Temporal range: Middle Eocene ~48–42 Ma

Scientific classification
- Domain: Eukaryota
- Kingdom: Animalia
- Phylum: Chordata
- Class: Mammalia
- Order: †Notoungulata
- Family: †Leontiniidae
- Genus: †Martinmiguelia; Bond & López, 1995
- Species: †M. fernandezi

Binomial name
- †Martinmiguelia fernandezi Bond & López, 1995

Extinct genus of notoungulates

Martinmiguelia is an extinct genus of Notoungulate, belonging to the family Leontiniidae. It lived during the Middle Eocene, and its fossil remains were found in South America.

== Description ==
This animal is only known from skull and mandible remains, and it probably shared similarities with later and better known leontiniids, such as Scarrittia. It was smaller-sized than those derived genera, approximately the size of a sheep. Martinmiguelia was characterized by an archaic dental formula, with a complete dentition (three incisors, one canine, four premolars and three molars) and a quasi-absence of diastema, except for small spaces around the small-sized canines. The molars and premolars were low-crowned (brachydont), a primitive condition for leontinnids. The upper incisors were canine-like and possessed labial girdles, and the second upper incisor was larger than the others.

== Classification ==
Martinmiguelia fernandezi was first described in 1995, based on fossils found in the Casa Grande Formation, in the Jujuy Province of Argentina, in terrains dated from the Mustersan (Middle Eocene). Martinmiguelia is considered to be one of the oldest and most basal members of the family Leontiniidae, a group of heavy toxodonts with massive builds. It was related with the Eocene genus Coquenia, and with the Oligocene genus Elmerriggsia.

== Bibliography ==
- M. Bond and G. M. López. 1995. Los Mamíferos de la Formación Casa Grande (Eoceno) de la Provincia de Jujuy, Argentina. Ameghiniana 32(3):301-309
- J. E. Powell, M. J. Babot, D. A. García López, M. V. Deraco, and C. Herrera. 2011. Eocene vertebrates of northwest Argentina: annotated list. In J. Salfity, R. A. Marquillas (eds.), Cenozoic Geology of the Central Andes of Argentina 349–370
- B. J. Shockey, J. J. Flynn, D. A. Croft, P. Gans, and A. R. Wyss. 2012. New leontiniid Notoungulata (Mammalia) from Chile and Argentina: comparative anatomy, character analysis, and phylogenetic hypotheses. American Museum Novitates 3737:1-64
