= Santa Rosa local fauna =

Peruvian fossils

Coordinates: 9°29′39″S 72°45′48″W

The Santa Rosa local fauna consists of the animals found in the Paleogene fossil site of Santa Rosa in eastern Peru. The age of the Santa Rosa fauna is difficult to determine, but may be Eocene (Mustersan) or Oligocene (Deseadan).

== History and context ==
Few fossils have been found in the vast rainforests of the Amazon Basin, and Santa Rosa was the first Paleogene fauna to be discovered in the region. The Santa Rosa local fauna was discovered in July 1995, and the discovery was briefly reported in 1996. In 1998, further fossil samples were taken at the site. Though not all of the material had been sorted, a report on the fauna was published in 2004 in a volume edited by Kenneth Campbell of the Natural History Museum of Los Angeles County. The publication was reviewed favorably by Bruce MacFadden in the Journal of Mammalian Evolution.

== Location and geology ==
The Santa Rosa fossil site is located in eastern Peru's Atalaya Province. It is about 7.0 kilometres (4.3 miles) north of the town of Breu, 7.5 kilometres (4.7 miles) south of the Brazilian border, and 2.0 kilometres (1.2 miles) north of a small village named Santa Rosa. It is on the left (west) bank of the Río Yurúa at an altitude of 215 metres (705 feet). The fossils were found in coarse fluvial deposits that form thin lenses along the bank of the river.

There is a number of similar rock units—so-called "red beds"—in the Tertiary deposits of western Amazonia, including eastern Peru, and it is difficult to assign the isolated Santa Rosa outcrop to any of them. However, Campbell and colleagues suggested on the basis of the stage of evolution of the rodents and marsupials found that Santa Rosa dates to the Mustersan South American Land Mammal Age, which is part of the Eocene. This would make it likely that it is part of the Yahuarango Formation, which may be Cretaceous to Eocene in age. On the other hand, they suggested that Santa Rosa could be younger, perhaps Oligocene, and could fall either into a continuation of the Yahuarango Formation or into the younger Chambira Formation. Indeed, María Vucetich noted in 2010 that some of the Santa Rosa rodents are similar to Deseadan (Oligocene) forms, and the notoungulates also suggest a younger age.

== Fauna ==
The Santa Rosa local fauna contains mammals, other vertebrates, and some crabs and charophyte algae. Not all of the fossils found at Santa Rosa have been described in detail yet, and not all the material retrieved has been sorted. Full descriptions have been published of the Santa Rosa marsupials, rodents, and notoungulates. Two single teeth that may represent a bat and a gondwanathere have also been described.

Other fossils found at Santa Rosa have not been described in detail. There are some xenarthrans, numerous fish representing at least five families, many crocodilians, some turtles, possibly some lizards, and a few fossils of amphibians and birds. Crab claws found at the site probably represent the family Pseudothelphusiidae.

The marsupial fauna of Santa Rosa is known from 79 isolated teeth, which represent eleven species. The fauna is taxonomically diverse, comprising members of the orders Microbiotheria (represented among living marsupials only by the monito del monte), Paucituberculata (shrew opossums), Didelphimorphia (opossums), and the extinct Sparassodonta and Polydolopimorphia. Two genera, Wirunodon and Kiruwamaq, cannot be assigned to any existing marsupial order. The largest species found, the sparassodont Patene campbelli, was cat-sized, but most species were the size of a mouse. Most Santa Rosa marsupials are thought to have been frugivores and/or insectivores; on the other hand, Patene was a carnivore. The most common species found, the polydolopimorphian Wamradolops tsulludon, shows features that suggest it was adapted for breaking down hard food items such as seeds or bark.

Hundreds of rodent fossils have been found at Santa Rosa, many of which cannot be identified precisely. These rodents are referable to the caviomorph group of rodents, which is unique to the Americas, and includes at least eleven species classified in the families Erethizontidae (New World porcupines), Echimyidae (spiny rats), and Agoutidae (agoutis). All Santa Rosa rodents share a common morphological pattern of the teeth, suggestive of a basal place in the caviomorph radiation.

The extinct "ungulate" order Notoungulata is represented by a few fossils only. Four isolated teeth may represent the same species, a sheep-sized member of the suborder Toxodontia. A single, very small tooth may belong to a member of the toxodont family Notohippidae. A jaw fragment is referable to the family Interatheriidae (suborder Typotheria).

A single damaged lower molar documents the possible presence of a bat at Santa Rosa. The specimen is fragmentary enough that it cannot be identified positively as a bat. It shows some features that suggest a relationship with the living bat family Noctilionidae (bulldog bats). When published, this specimen represented the oldest known South American bat, but an older bat was described from Argentina in 2005.

Another isolated tooth, LACM 149371, cannot be aligned securely with any mammalian group. Francisco Goin and colleagues, who described this specimen, tentatively suggested that it represents an upper molar of a member of the family Ferugliotheriidae, part of the ancient and enigmatic group Gondwanatheria. If this identification is correct, it would be among the youngest known gondwanatheres.

== Faunal list ==
The following species of mammals have been recorded at Santa Rosa:

- Order Primates
  - Suborder Anthropoidea
    - Family indeterminate
      - Genus Perupithecus
        - Perupithecus ucayaliensis
- Order indeterminate
  - Possibly family Ferugliotheriidae (LACM 149371)
- Order Didelphimorphia (opossums)
  - cf. Family Herpetotheriidae
    - Genus Rumiodon
      - Rumiodon inti
      - Rumiodon sp.
- Order Sparassodonta
  - Family Hathliacynidae
    - Genus Patene
      - Patene campbelli
- Order Polydolopimorphia
  - Family Prepidolopidae
    - Genus Incadolops
      - Incadolops ucayali
  - Family indeterminate
    - Genus Hondonadia
      - Hondonadia pittmanae
    - Genus Wamradolops
      - Wamradolops tsullodon
- Order Paucituberculata (shrew opossums)
  - Family Caenolestidae
    - Genus Perulestes
      - Perulestes cardichi
      - Perulestes fraileyi
  - cf. Family Palaeothentidae
    - Genus Sasawatsu
      - Sasawatsu mahaynaq
- Order Microbiotheria (monito del monte)
  - Family Microbiotheriidae
    - Genus Kirutherium
      - Kirutherium paititiensis
- Marsupialia, order and family indeterminate
  - Genus Kiruwamaq
    - Kiruwamaq chisu
  - Genus Wirunodon
    - Wirunodon chanku
- Order Notoungulata
  - Suborder Toxodontia
    - Family, genus and species indeterminate (perhaps more than one species)
    - cf. Family Notohippidae
      - Genus and species indeterminate
  - Suborder Typotheria
    - Family Interatheriidae
      - Genus and species indeterminate
- Order Rodentia (rodents)
  - Family Erethizontidae (New World porcupines)
    - Genus Eopululo
      - Eopululo wigmorei
  - Family Agoutidae (agoutis)
    - Genus Eobrasinamys
      - Eobrasinamys riverai
      - Eobranisamys romeropittmanae
    - Genus Eoincamys
      - Eoincamys ameghinoi
      - Eoincamys pascuali
    - Genus Eopicure
      - Eopicure kraglievichi
    - Genus and species indeterminate A
    - Genus and species indeterminate B
    - Genus and species indeterminate C
  - Family Echimyidae (spiny rats)
    - Genus Eodelphomys
      - Eodelphomys almeidacomposi
    - Genus Eoespina
      - Eoespina woodi
    - Genus Eosachacui
      - Eosachacui lavocati
    - Genus Eosallamys
      - Eosallamys paulacoutoi
      - Eosallamys simpsoni
    - Genus and species indeterminate A
    - Genus and species indeterminate B
    - Genus and species indeterminate C
- Order Chiroptera (bats)
  - Family, genus, and species indeterminate
