= Chubutophis =

Chubutophis Temporal range: Eocene (Casamayoran) ~48 Ma

Scientific classification
- Kingdom: Animalia
- Phylum: Chordata
- Class: Reptilia
- Order: Squamata
- Suborder: Serpentes
- Family: Boidae
- Genus: †Chubutophis; Albino, 1993

Type species
- †Chubutophis grandis Albino, 1993

Extinct genus of snakes

Chubutophis is a genus of extinct boid snakes from the Eocene-aged Sarmiento Formation in Chubut Province, Argentina. It is known from a partial set of vertebrae suggesting a juvenile individual. The type species is C. grandis.

== Size ==
According to Adriana Albino, the describing researcher:

Considering that this material is from a young specimen, its size is extraordinary and it is estimated that the adult would have reached greater dimensions than those observed in the largest snakes known up to the present, including Madtsoia and Gigantophis

== Ecology ==
The large size of Chubutophis was probably due to the more varied and abundant mammals of larger size providing their most frequent prey.
