= Seca Formation, Ecuador =

Seca Formation
- Stratigraphic range: Late Eocene (Divisaderan-Tinguirirican); ~37–34 Ma
- Type: Geological formation
- Unit of: Ancón Group
- Underlies: Punta Ancón Formation
- Overlies: Socorro Formation

Lithology
- Primary: Shale

Location
- Coordinates: 2.3°S 80.8°W
- Approximate paleocoordinates: 4.8°S 73.8°W
- Region: Santa Elena Province
- Country: Ecuador
- Extent: Progreso Basin
- Seca Formation, Ecuador (Ecuador)

The Seca Formation is a Late Eocene (Divisaderan to Tinguirirican in the SALMA classification) geologic formation of the Progreso Basin in southwestern Ecuador. The shales of the formation have provided fossils of the marine snake Pterosphenus sheppardi, P.shepardi is the only species of the genus in South America .

== Description ==
The Seca Formation, part of the Ancón Group, conformably overlies the Socorro Formation and is overlain by the Punta Ancón Formation. The Seca Formation comprises grey to greenish shales deposited in a marine platform with submarine fans environment. The formation is a reservoir rock, and potential source rock, in the oil-rich Progreso Basin.

== See also ==
- List of fossiliferous stratigraphic units in Ecuador
