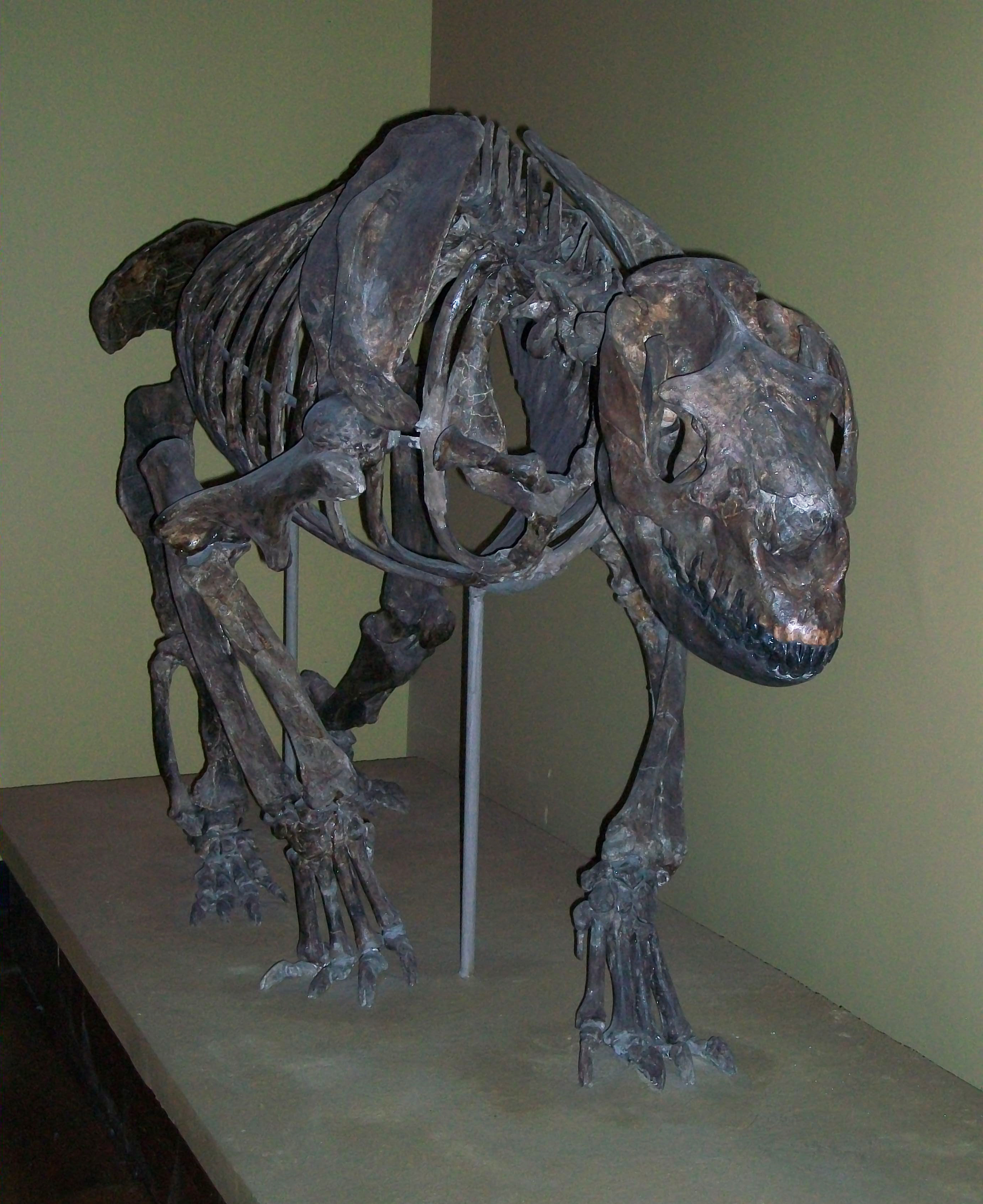
- Skeleton of Homalodotherium

Scientific classification
- Kingdom: Animalia
- Phylum: Chordata
- Class: Mammalia
- Order: †Notoungulata
- Suborder: †Toxodontia
- Family: †Homalodotheriidae; Gregory 1910

Genera
- †Asmodeus; †Chasicotherium; †Homalodotherium; †Trigonolophodon

= Homalodotheriidae =

Homalodotheriidae Temporal range: Late Eocene-Late Miocene (Tinguirirican-Chasicoan) ~33.9–9 Ma

Extinct family of mammals

Homalodotheriidae is an extinct family comprising four genera of notoungulate mammals known from the Late Eocene (Tinguirirican) through Late Miocene (Chasicoan) of Argentina and Chile in South America.
