= Chasicotherium =

Chasicotherium Temporal range: Late Miocene (Chasicoan) ~10–9 Ma

Scientific classification
- Kingdom: Animalia
- Phylum: Chordata
- Class: Mammalia
- Order: †Notoungulata
- Family: †Homalodotheriidae
- Genus: †Chasicotherium; Cabrera & Kraglievich 1931
- Species: †C. rothi

Binomial name
- †Chasicotherium rothi Ameghino 1887

Extinct genus of notoungulates

Chasicotherium is an extinct genus of a large notoungulate mammal known originally from a partial skull and mandible discovered in the Arroyo Chasicó Formation, in the stream of Party of Villarino, Buenos Aires, Argentina. The sediments in which the animal was discovered dates to 10 to 9 million years (Chasicoan). It is known only from the type species, C. rothi. Its weight was approximately 1 tonne (0.98 long tons; 1.1 short tons), being the largest and most recent member of the family Homalodotheriidae. It was a large herbivore of the Miocene Pampas, closely related to Homalodotherium, which also shares the reduced dental formula of the short premaxilla.
