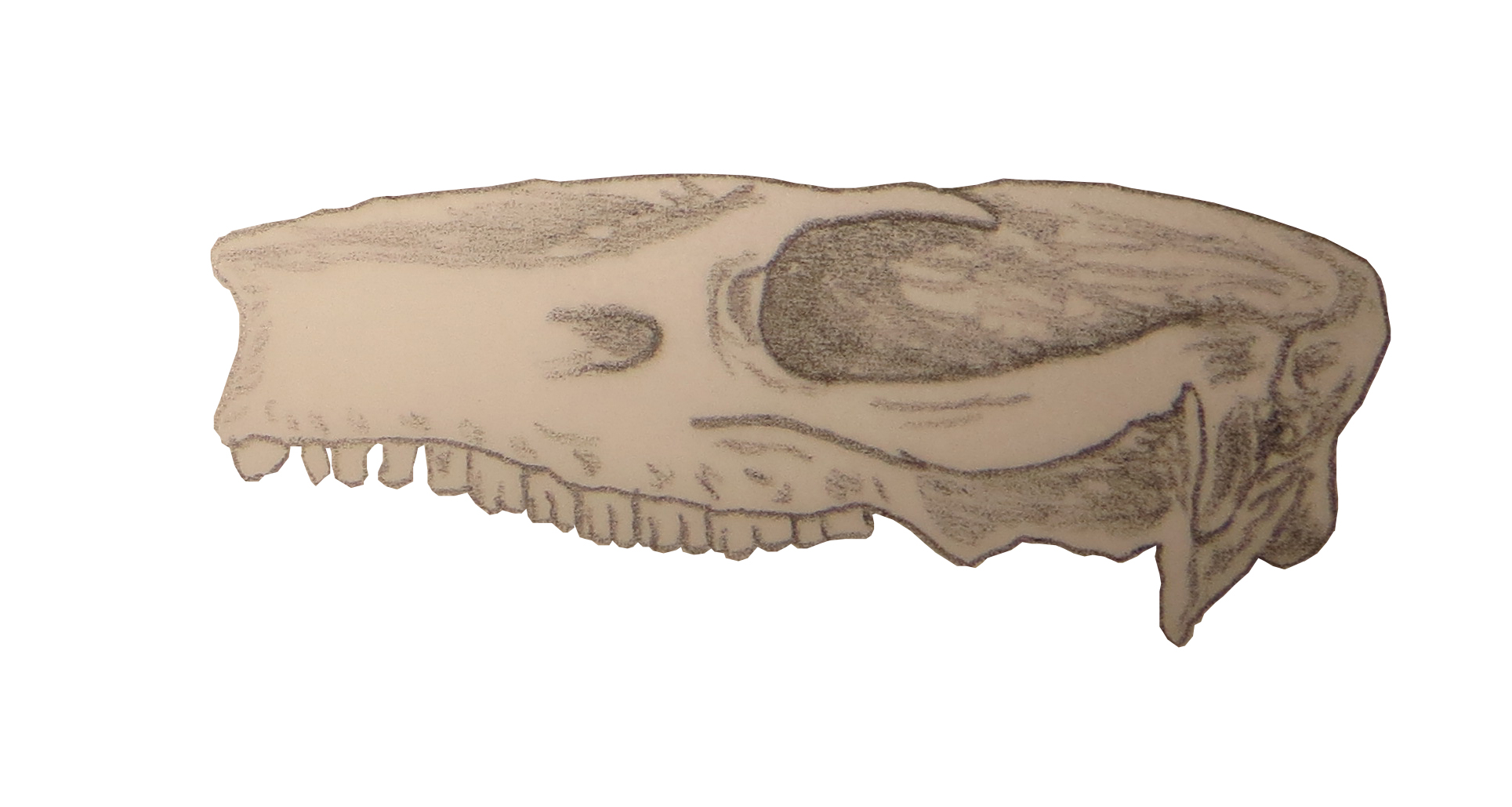
- Skull of Archaeohyrax

Scientific classification
- Kingdom: Animalia
- Phylum: Chordata
- Class: Mammalia
- Order: †Notoungulata
- Suborder: †Typotheria
- Family: †Archaeohyracidae; Ameghino 1897

Genera
- Archaeohyrax; Archaeotypotherium; Bryanpattersonia; Eohyrax; Protarchaeohyrax; Pseudhyrax; Punahyrax

= Archaeohyracidae =

Archaeohyracidae Temporal range: Late Paleocene-Late Oligocene (Casamayoran-Deseadan) ~49–24 Ma

Extinct family of mammals

Archaeohyracidae is an extinct family of notoungulate mammals known from the Paleocene through the Oligocene of South America. First named in 1897, it is now thought to be paraphyletic, rather than a genuine group of closely related animals with a single, unique, ancestor.
