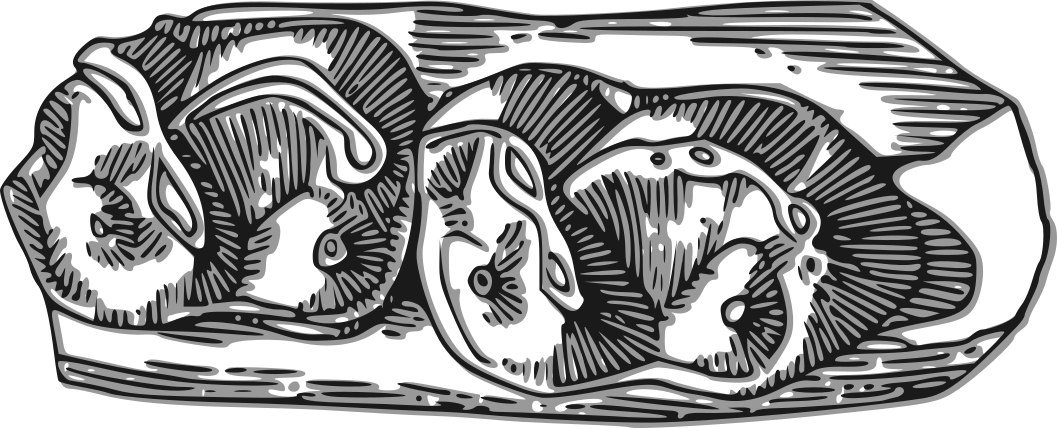
- Teeth of Isotemnus ctalego

Scientific classification
- Kingdom: Animalia
- Phylum: Chordata
- Class: Mammalia
- Order: †Notoungulata
- Family: †Isotemnidae
- Genus: †Isotemnus; Ameghino 1897

Type species
- †Isotemnus primitivus Ameghino, 1897

Species
- I. ctalego Simpson 1935; I. haugi Roth 1901; I. latidens Ameghino 1901; I. primitivus Ameghino 1897

Synonyms
- Amphitemnus Ameghino 1904; Dimerostephanos Ameghino 1902; Eochalicotherium Ameghino 1901; Leifunia Roth 1901; Prostylops Ameghino 1897

= Isotemnus =

Isotemnus Temporal range: Late Paleocene-Middle Eocene ~60–45 Ma

Extinct genus of notoungulates

Isotemnus is an extinct genus of notoungulate belonging to the family Isotemnidae. It lived from the Late Paleocene to the Middle Eocene of what is now Argentina.

== Description ==
This genus was smaller than Thomashuxleya and Periphragnis, and did not exceed 50 kilograms in weight. Its build was comparable to a modern peccary, with a body relatively massive and strong and sturdy legs. Compared to other Eocene notoungulates, like basal Notohippidae and Notostylopidae, Isotemnus had an humerus whose distal part had a high medial trochlear crest, while the bicipital radial tuberosity was almost unexistant. The astragalus had a broad and low trochlea with a short neck. The calcaneus had rectangular fibular facets, and an unusually thick sustentaculum. Several of the distinctive anatomical leg characteristics of Isotemnus could be due to its smaller size; Periphragnis and Thomashuxleya, while very similar, had different characteristics.

== Classification ==
Isotemnus is the eponymous genus of the family Isotemnidae, a possibly paraphyletic group of notoungulates including the most basal forms of toxodonts. Isotemnus was one of the most archaic and basal of the isotemnids. The type species is Isotemnus primitivus, first described in 1897 by Florentino Ameghino, based on fossil remains found in terrains dating back from the Early Eocene of Argentine Patagonia. Other species were later attributed to the genus, such as I. ctalego (Early Eocene), I. haugi (Early Eocene, initially described as Leifunia haugi), I. latidens (Middle Eocene). Fragmentary remains attributed to Isotemnus were discovered in Late Paleocene formations in Argentina.

== Bibliography ==
- F. Ameghino. 1897. Mammiféres crétacés de l’Argentine (Deuxième contribution à la connaissance de la fauna mammalogique de couches à Pyrotherium) [Cretaceous mammals of Argentina (second contribution to the knowledge of the mammalian fauna of the Pyrotherium Beds)]. Boletin Instituto Geografico Argentino 18(4–9):406-521
- F. Ameghino. 1901. Notices préliminaires sur des ongulés nouveaux des terrains crétacés de Patagonie [Preliminary notes on new ungulates from the Cretaceous terrains of Patagonia]. Boletin de la Academia Nacional de Ciencias de Córdoba 16:349-429
- F. Ameghino. 1902. Notices préliminaires sur des mammifères nouveaux des terrains Crétacé de Patagonie {preliminary notes on new mammals from the Cretaceous terrains of Patagonia]. Boletin de la Academia Nacional de Ciencias de Córdoba 17:5-70
- G. G. Simpson. 1935a. Occurrence and relationships of the Rio Chico fauna of Patagonia. American Museum Novitates 818:1-21
- G. G. Simpson. 1935b. Descriptions of the oldest known South American mammals, from the Rio Chico Formation. American Museum Novitates 793:1-25
- G. G. Simpson. 1967. The beginning of the age of mammals in South America. Part II. Bulletin of the American Museum of Natural History 137:1-260
- Vucetich, M. G., & Bond, M. (1982). Los primeros Isotemnidae (Mammalia, Notoungulata) registrados en la Formación Lumbrera (Grupo Salta), del noroeste argentino. Ameghiniana, 19(1–2), 7–18.
- M. O. Woodburne, F. J. Goin, M. S. Raigemborn, M. Heizler, J. N. Gelfo and E. V. Oliveira. 2014. Revised timing of the South American early Paleogene land mammal ages. Journal of South American Earth Sciences 54:109-119
- Malena Lorente 2020. "The Limb Anatomy of Isotemnus, One of the Most Basal Toxodontid Notoungulates (Mammalia, Paso Del Sapo Fauna)," Ameghiniana, 57(2), 80–89.
