= Farellones Formation =

Geologic formation in Chile

- Stratigraphic range: Miocene
- Type: Geologic formation
- Sub-units: Upper member Lower member
- Overlies: Abanico Formation
- Thickness: >3,000 m (9,800 ft)

Lithology
- Primary: Rhyolitic ignimbrite, rhyolitic tuff, andesitic lava, basaltic lava
- Other: Breccia

Location
- Coordinates: 33°21′3″S 70°18′50″W
- Region: Valparaíso Region; Santiago Metropolitan Region; O'Higgins Region
- Country: Chile
- Extent: Central Andes

Type section
- Named for: Farellones
- Named by: Klohn
- Year defined: 1960
- Farellones Formation (Chile)

Farellones Formation (Spanish: Formación Farellones) is a geological formation of Miocene age in the Andes of Central Chile made up almost entirely of volcanic and volcaniclastic rocks. At some location reaches thicknesses in excess of 3,000 metres (9,800 ft). It overlies the Oligo–Miocene Abanico Formation across a diachronous unconformity. The best exposure of the formation is said to be at the ski resort of Farellones east of Santiago.

== Description ==
Jorge Muñoz Cristi was in 1957 the first to define the rocks of Farellones as distinct unit and not as a facies as previously thought. Carlos Klohn then established the Farellones unit as a formation in 1960.

Rivano and co-workers define two sub-units of the formation: a lower member made up of rather fresh rhyolitic ignimbrite and tuff, and an upper member made up of lavas of basaltic and andesitic composition. The volcanic rocks of Farellones Formation have mostly a calc-alkaline character contrasting with the mostly tholeiitic Abanico Formation.

From the latitude of Santiago to Rancagua the base of the formation becomes progressively younger and outcrops more scarce. In the mentioned latitudes the formation has been deformed by a diachronous tectonic inversion that produced reverse faults and destroyed the extensional sedimentary basin were the rocks deposited and contributed to the uplift of the Andes in the Late Miocene.
