= Huitrera Formation =

Geological formation in Argentina

- Stratigraphic range: Early Eocene (Casamayoran); 54.69–53.79 Ma
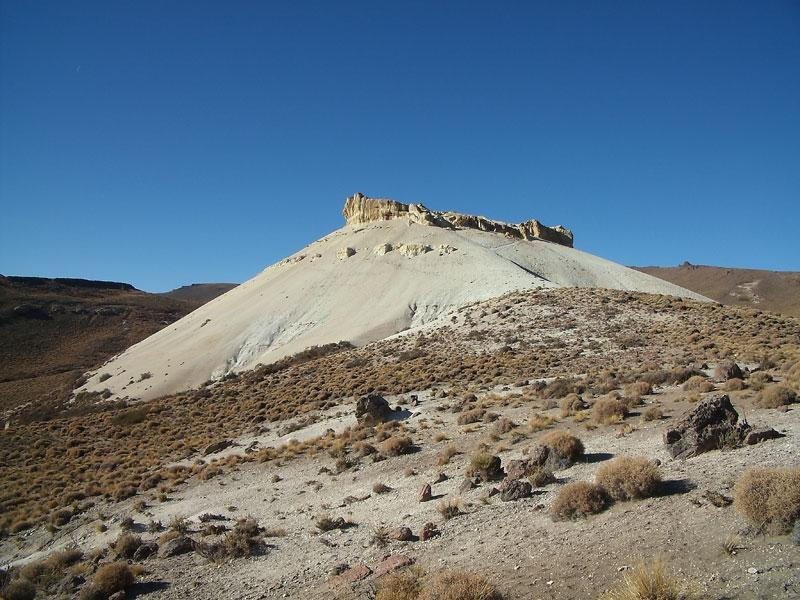
- Type: Geological formation
- Underlies: Collón Curá Formation
- Overlies: Angostura Colorada Formation
- Thickness: Up to 1,300 m (4,300 ft)

Lithology
- Primary: Mudstone, sandstone
- Other: Andesites, dacitic & rhyolitic ignimbrites, volcanic breccias, tuffs & trachybasalts

Location
- Coordinates: 41.0°S 71.2°W
- Approximate paleocoordinates: 43.5°S 61.2°W
- Region: Neuquén & Río Negro Provinces
- Country: Argentina
- Extent: Neuquén Basin

Type section
- Named for: Cerro Huitrera
- Named by: Ravazzoli & Sesana
- Year defined: 1977
- Huitrera Formation (Argentina)

The Huitrera Formation is a geological formation in the Neuquén Basin in northern Patagonian Argentina whose strata date back to the Early Eocene of the Paleogene, or Casamayoran in the South American land mammal age classification.

The formation is together with the Reyhuau basalts part of the Pilcaniyeu Belt, a volcanic belt active in Paleocene to middle Eocene times.

== Description ==
The Huitrera Formation was first defined by Ravazzoli and Sesana in 1977. The name has been used to identify various volcaniclastic sequences, among others in the Ñirihuau fold-and-thrust belt. The up to 1,300 metres (4,300 ft) thick formation comprises mudstones and sandstones deposited in a crater lake environment. Part of the formation comprises andesites, dacitic and rhyolitic ignimbrites, volcanic breccias, tuffs and trachybasalts.

The formation was initially described as Late Eocene to Early Oligocene, but was later dated to 54.24 ± 0.45 Ma, meaning the Huitrera Formation is Ypresian, or in the SALMA classification, Casamayoran in age.

== Fossil content ==
The following macrofossils were reported from the formation:

- Birds
  - Ueekenkcoracias
- Amphibians
  - Llankibatrachus truebae
  - Patagopipa corsolinii
- Insects
  - Odonata
    - Inacayalestes aikunhuapi
  - Beetles
    - Thesaurus punctatus (originally Catogenus)
- Flora
  - Menispermites calderensis
  - Raiguenrayun cura
  - Cupressaceae indet.
  - Podocarpaceae indet.
  - Lauraceae indet.

The formation has also provided many pollen, analyzed in 2003 by Melendi et al.

== See also ==
- South American land mammal ages
- Laguna del Hunco Formation, contemporaneous fossiliferous formation of the Cañadón Asfalto Basin
- Itaboraí Formation, fossiliferous formation of the Itaboraí Basin of Brazil
- Bogotá Formation, contemporaneous fossil flora-bearing formation of central Colombia
- Green River Formation, contemporaneous fossiliferous formation of the central-western United States
- Klondike Mountain Formation, contemporaneous fossil flora-bearing formation of Washington State
- Messel pit, Eocene crater lake Lagerstätte of Germany
