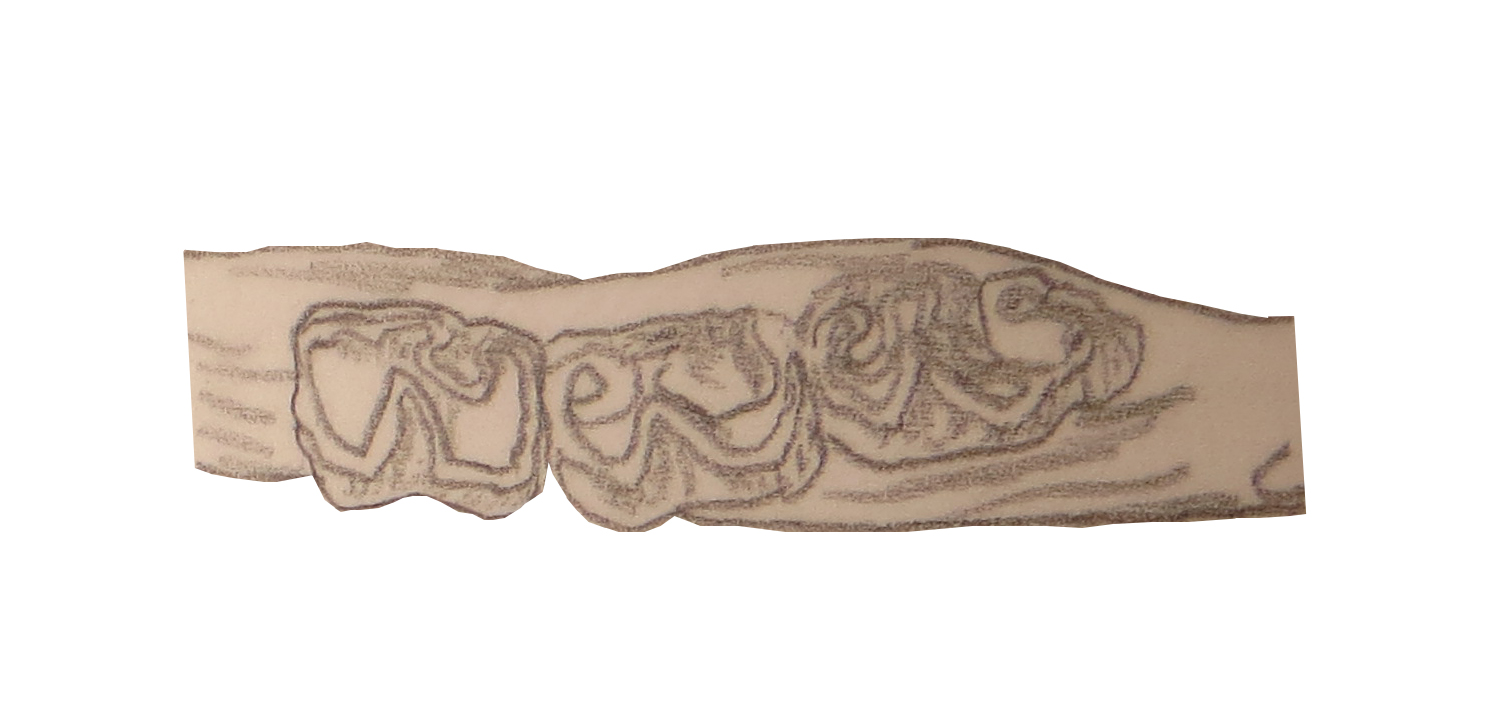
- Mandible of Anisolambda amel

Scientific classification
- Kingdom: Animalia
- Phylum: Chordata
- Class: Mammalia
- Order: †Litopterna
- Family: †Proterotheriidae
- Subfamily: †Anisolambdinae
- Genus: †Anisolambda; Ameghino 1901

Type species
- †Anisolambda fissidens Ameghino, 1901

Species
- A. amel Simpson 1948; A. fissidens Ameghino 1901

Synonyms
- Josepholeidya Ameghino 1901; Ricardolydekkeria Ameghino 1901

= Anisolambda =

Anisolambda Temporal range: Late Paleocene-Middle Eocene (Peligran-Mustersan) ~58–45 Ma

Extinct genus of litopterns

Anisolambda is an extinct genus of litoptern. It lived from the Late Paleocene to the Middle Eocene in what is now Argentina.

== Description ==
This animal is mostly known from fossils of its maxilla, mandible and teeth, and it is therefore difficult to speculate on its appearance. Its molars were primitive in shape, and closely resembled those of the enigmatic Didolodus. They were distinguished from the latter by the presence of a strong paraconid, in an internal position, almost identical in size to the metaconid, and separated from the latter by a narrow indentation. Anisolambda may have been similar to more recent genera of Proterotheriidae, such as Diadiaphorus or Proterotherium, but without the characteristic limb specializations of the latter genera.

== Classification ==
The genus Anisolambda was first described in 1901 by Florentino Ameghino, based on a mandible with teeth from the Eocene of Argentina. Ameghino latter described fossils of the maxilla, that he attributed to the genus Josepholeidya. Subsequent discoveries in slightly older terrains from the Late Paleocene of Brazil, including associated maxilla and mandible (which is now thought to belong to a different genus, Paranisolambda), have allowed the researchers to understand that Anisolambda and Josepholeidya belonged to the same genus. The type species is Anisolambda fissidens, from the Early and Middle Eocene of Argentina. Anisolambda amel was described by George Gaylord Simpson in 1948.

Anisolambda is one of the earliest litopterns, and its systematic position isn't clear due to its primitive dental characteristics. It is supposed that Anisolambda was one of the earliest and most basal members of Proterotheriidae, a clade of small to medium-sized litopterns, which in the course of their evolution developed horse-like forms, specially regarding the specializations of their legs. Anisolambda belonged to a separate subfamily, Anisolambdinae, including one the most basal proterotheres; sometimes this clade is elevated to the rank of family, Anisolambdidae.
