= Llankibatrachus =

Llankibatrachus Temporal range: Ypresian (Casamayoran) ~48 Ma

Scientific classification
- Domain: Eukaryota
- Kingdom: Animalia
- Phylum: Chordata
- Class: Amphibia
- Order: Anura
- Family: Pipidae
- Genus: †Llankibatrachus; Báez & Pugener 2003

Type species
- Llankibatrachus truebae Báez & Pugener 2003

Extinct genus of amphibians

Llankibatrachus is an extinct genus of prehistoric frogs in the family Pipidae. They are known from the Ypresian (Casamayoran) Huitrera Formation of Argentina.

== Description ==
The type species and the only known species, Llankibatrachus truebae, is named after Linda Trueb, a herpetologist from the University of Kansas. The species is known from two deposits near the Nahuel Huapi Lake in north-western Patagonia, Argentina. The finds include nearly complete specimens with impressions of skin, and individuals of different developmental stages, including tadpoles.

== See also ==
- Prehistoric amphibian
- List of prehistoric amphibians
