= Laguna Brava Formation =

Geologic formation in Argentina

- Stratigraphic range: Late Eocene (Tinguirirican)
- Type: Geological formation
- Overlies: Quebrada Santo Domingo Formation

Lithology
- Primary: Sandstone, red beds, tuff

Location
- Coordinates: 28.5°S 68.8°W
- Approximate paleocoordinates: 30.6°S 60.6°W
- Region: Mendoza Province, Argentine Northwest
- Country: Argentina
- Extent: Precordillera

Type section
- Named for: Laguna Brava
- Laguna Brava Formation (Argentina)

Laguna Brava Formation (Spanish: Formación Laguna Brava), formerly referred to as Santo Domingo Formation, is a Late Eocene (Tinguirirican in the SALMA classification) sedimentary formation located in the Argentine Northwest. The formation contains beds with fossil bird tracks described as Gruipeda dominguensis.

It was formerly thought that the formation was of Triassic age.
