= Eopululo =

Eopululo Temporal range: Late Eocene-Early Oligocene (Divisaderan-Deseadan) ~37.2–28.4 Ma

Scientific classification
- Domain: Eukaryota
- Kingdom: Animalia
- Phylum: Chordata
- Class: Mammalia
- Order: Rodentia
- Family: Erethizontidae
- Genus: †Eopululo; Frailey & Campbell 2004
- Species: †E. wigmorei

Binomial name
- †Eopululo wigmorei Frailey & Campbell 2004

Extinct species of rodent

Eopululo is the oldest known genus of New World porcupines (Erethizontidae). It is known only from the possibly late Late Eocene to Early Oligocene (Divisaderan to Deseadan in the SALMA classification) of the Yahuarango Formation at the Santa Rosa local fauna site of Ucayali Department, eastern Peru. There is only one species in the genus, Eopululo wigmorei. It was described in 2004, and it is a member of one of the oldest rodent faunas known from South America.
