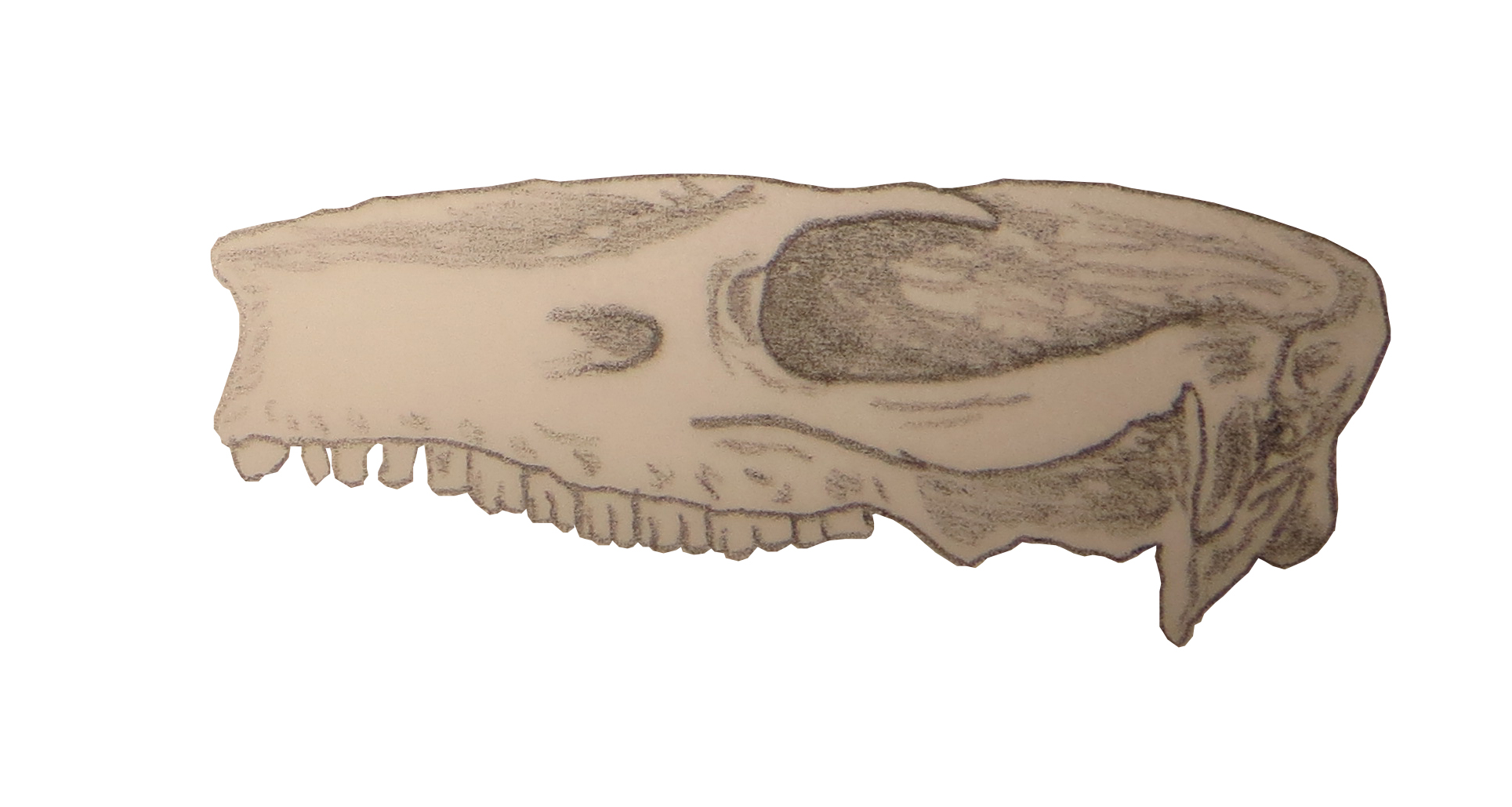
- Archaeohyrax patagonicus

Scientific classification
- Kingdom: Animalia
- Phylum: Chordata
- Class: Mammalia
- Order: †Notoungulata
- Family: †Archaeohyracidae
- Genus: †Archaeohyrax; Ameghino, 1897

Type species
- †Archaeohyrax patagonicus Ameghino, 1897

Species
- A. patagonicus Ameghino 1897; A. proavus Ameghino 1897; A. propheticus Ameghino 1897; A. suniensis Billet et al. 2009

= Archaeohyrax =

Archaeohyrax Temporal range: Mid Eocene-Late Oligocene (Mustersan-Deseadan) ~48.0–23.03 Ma

Extinct genus of notoungulates

Archaeohyrax is a genus of extinct notoungulate mammal known from the Middle Eocene to Oligocene of Argentina and Bolivia.

== Description ==
The holotype of the type species, A. patagonicus, is a skull with a tall, blunt muzzle, and high-crowned cheek teeth. A. patagonicus was an extremely hypsodont animal, scoring 2.74 on the Hypsodonty Index. When the skull is compared to those of the superficially similar hyraxes, the remains suggest a small animal approximately 45 centimetres (18 in) long. The species A. suniensis is distinguished from A. patagonicus by the second mental foramen being situated more anteriorly in the former than in the latter, by the stylomastoid foramen in A. suniensis being situated closer to the tympanohyal recess than in A. patagonicus, and by the smaller facial extent of the premaxillae of A. suniensis.

== Distribution ==
Fossils of Archaeohyrax have been found in the Sarmiento, Agua de la Piedra, and Deseado Formations of Argentina and the Salla Formation of the Salla-Luribay Basin of Bolivia.

== Palaeobiology ==
=== Palaeoecology ===
The dental microwear of A. suniensis indicates that it was an herbivorous grazer, as its pattern of microscopic wear matches that of known grazers.
