= Johnbell =

Johnbell Temporal range: Early Oligocene (Tinguirirican) ~33–31 Ma

Scientific classification
- Kingdom: Animalia
- Phylum: Chordata
- Class: Mammalia
- Order: †Notoungulata
- Family: †Interatheriidae
- Genus: †Johnbell; Hitz, Flynn & Wyss, 2006
- Species: †J. hatcheri

Binomial name
- †Johnbell hatcheri Hitz, Flynn & Wyss, 2006

Extinct genus of notoungulates

Johnbell is an extinct genus of ungulates in the family Interatheriidae. The only known species belonging to the genus is Johnbell hatcheri. This animal was named after American paleontologist John Bell Hatcher. This genus is related to Ignigena and the subfamily Interatheriinae. This animal lived in central Chile during the Early Oligocene.
