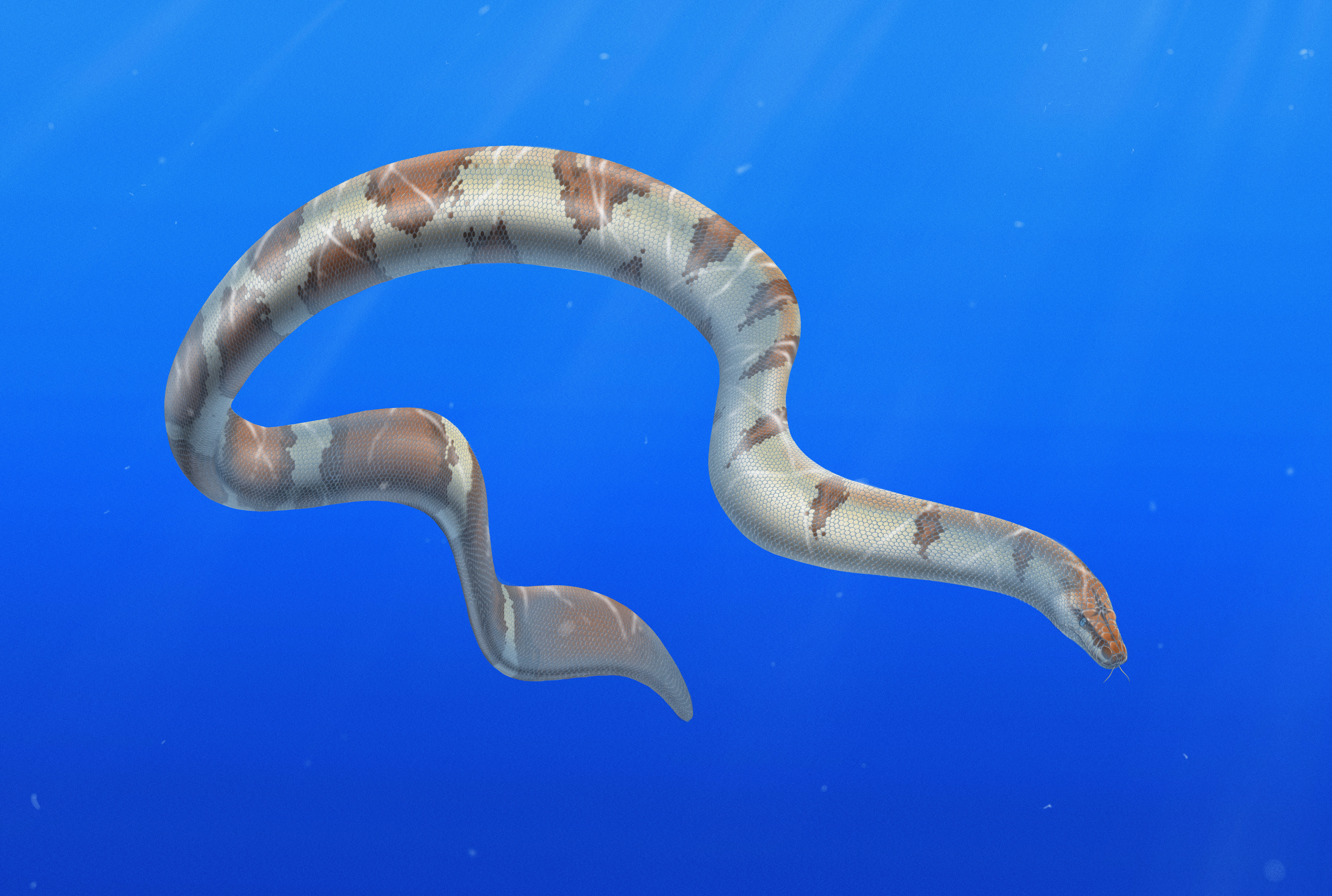
- Life restoration of Pterosphenus

Scientific classification
- Kingdom: Animalia
- Phylum: Chordata
- Class: Reptilia
- Order: Squamata
- Suborder: Serpentes
- Family: †Palaeophiidae
- Subfamily: †Palaeophiinae
- Genus: †Pterosphenus; Lucas, 1898

Type species
- †Pterosphenus schucherti Lucas, 1898

Species
- †Pterosphenus biswasi Rage et al. 2003; †Pterosphenus kutchensis Rage et al. 2003; †Pterosphenus rannensis Datta & Bajpai 2025; †Pterosphenus schucherti Lucas 1898; †Pterosphenus schweinfurthi Andrews 1901; †Pterosphenus sheppardi Hoffstetter 1958

Synonyms
- Mœriophis schweinfurthi (Andrews, 1901)

= Pterosphenus =

Pterosphenus Temporal range: Eocene

Extinct genus of snakes

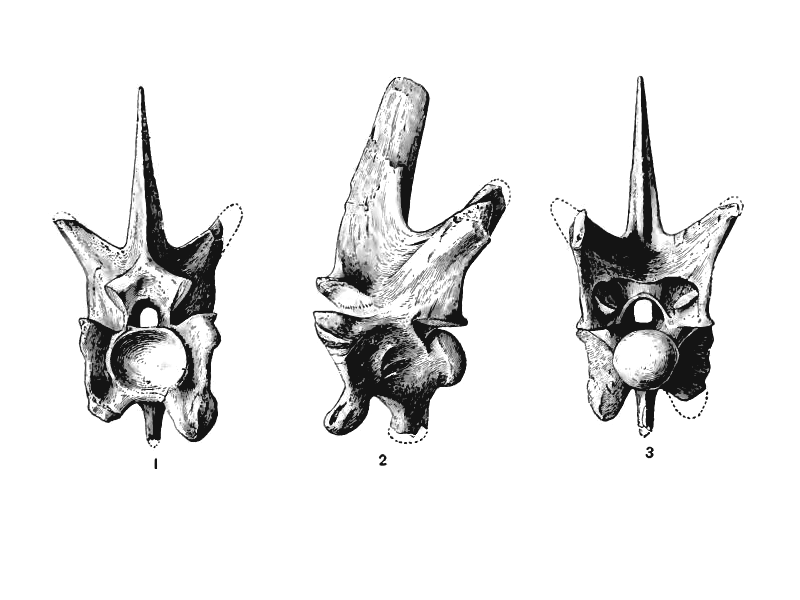
The very high and narrow vertebra of Pterosphenus schucherti hint at the highly specialised aquatic lifestyle of the genus.

Pterosphenus is an extinct genus of marine snake of the Eocene period.

== Classification ==
Pterosphenus belong to the Alethinophidia snakes, a clade which includes all snakes outside of blind and thread snakes, and more specifically to the extinct Palaeophiidae. Its closest relative is Palaeophis, of which both belong to the subfamily Palaeophiinae. Six species are known, P. schucherti from United States(Alabama, Arkansas, Florida, Georgia, Louisiana, Mississippi, South Carolina, Texas and New Jersey) and Harudi Formation of India, P. sheppardi from Seca Formation of Ecuador, P. schweinfurthi from Egypt, Morocco, Libya and Angola and P. biswasi, P. kutchensis, and P. rannensis from Panandhro and Cambay Shale Formation of India.

== Description ==
While only known from partial remains, enough has been found of Pterosphenus to suggest it was a large reptile. Based on the regression model used to estimate the length of boids, the most reliable length estimate lies between 2.5 and 4.8 metres (8.2 and 15.7 ft); the largest vertebra may have belonged to an individual reaching 5.7 metres (19 ft) in length. Its body was strongly laterally compressed as an adaptation to pelagic life.

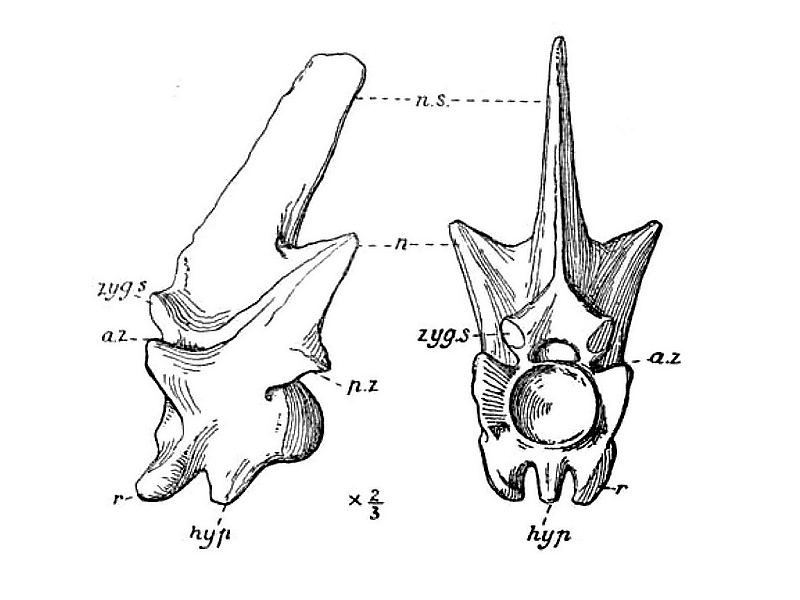
Vertebrae of Pterosphenus rannensis from India(left) and Pterosphenus schweinfurthi from Egypt(right)

== Palaeoenvironment and Palaeoecology ==
A marine ocean dweller, Pterosphenus lived in the shallow seas of the future eastern US (fossils are known from Texas, Louisiana, Mississippi, and Arkansas and up north to New Jersey), Africa in the Tethys Ocean (fossils are known from Morocco, Libya, Nigeria, and Egypt), South America (fossils are known from Ecuador) and southern Asia (fossils are known from India). Pterosphenus was a top predator of the ecosystem, likely preying on fish and molluscs found in the same area.

It is certain that Pterosphenus would have encountered basal cetaceans of the time like Zygorhiza, Dorudon, and Basilosaurus, though its likely a mixed of niche partitioning and living in different areas in the case of Basilosaurus (which lived in estuary ecosystems according to recent finds) would prevent competition between the species.
