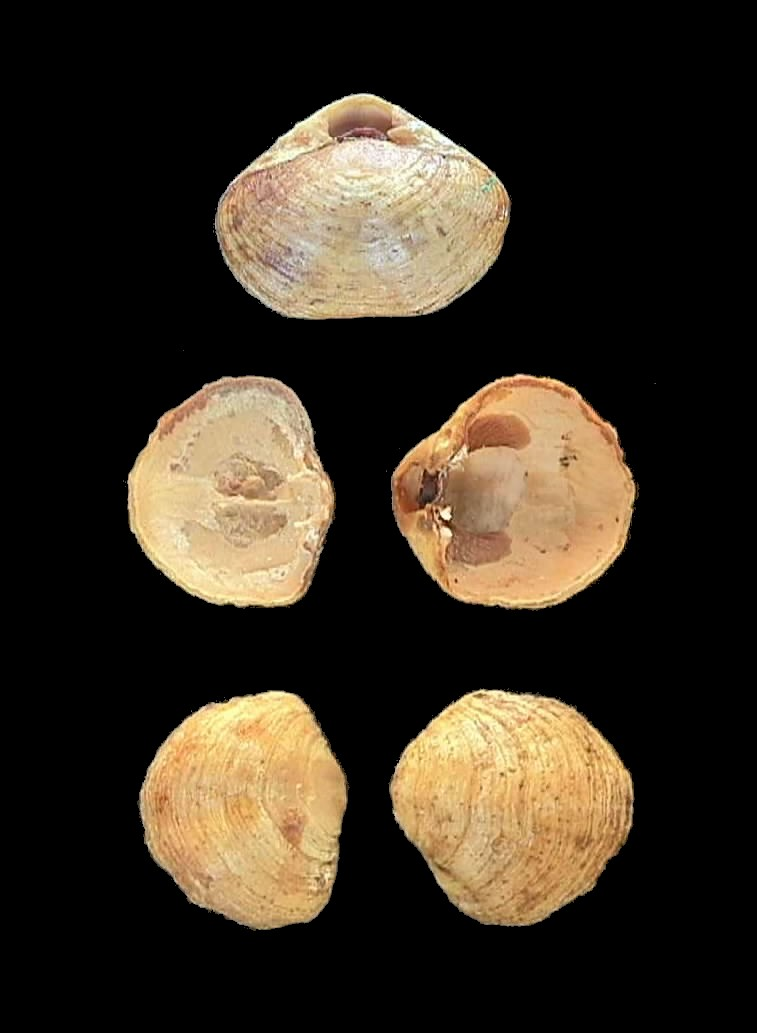
- Terebratella sanguinea

Scientific classification
- Domain: Eukaryota
- Kingdom: Animalia
- Phylum: Brachiopoda
- Class: Rhynchonellata
- Order: Terebratulida
- Family: Terebratellidae
- Genus: Terebratella d'Orbigny, 1847

Synonyms
- Magasella Dall, 1870

= Terebratella =

Genus of brachiopods

Terebratella is a genus of brachiopods belonging to the family Terebratellidae.

The genus has almost cosmopolitan distribution.

Species:

- Terebratella crenulata Sowerby, 1846
- Terebratella crofti Owen, 1980
- Terebratella dorsata (Gmelin, 1790)
- Terebratella labradorensis Sowerby, 1846
- Terebratella sanguinea (Leach, 1814)
- Terebratella sookensis Clark & Arnold, 1923
- Terebratella tenuis Tort, 2003
