= Tinguiririca fauna =

The fossil Tinguiririca fauna, entombed in volcanic mudflows and ash layers at the onset of the Oligocene, about 33-31.5 million years ago, represents a unique snapshot of the history of South America's endemic fauna, which was extinguished when the former island continent was joined to North America by the rising Isthmus of Panama. The fossil-bearing sedimentary layers of the Abanico Formation were first discovered in the valley of the Tinguiririca River, high in the Andes of central Chile. The faunal assemblage lends its name to the Tinguirirican stage in the South American land mammal age (SALMA) classification.

== Description ==
The endemic fauna bridges a massive gap in the history of those mammals that were unique to South America. Paleontologists knew the earlier sloth and anteater forebears of 40 mya, but no fossils from this previously poorly sampled transitional age had been seen. Fossils of the Tinguiririca fauna include the chinchilla-like earliest rodents discovered in South America, a wide range of the hoofed herbivores called notoungulates, a shrew-like marsupial and ancestors of today's sloth and armadillos. Many of the herbivores have teeth adapted to grass-eating; though no plant fossils have been recovered, the high-crowned hypsodont teeth, protected by tough enamel well below the gumline, identifies grazers suited to a gritty diet. "The proportion of hypsodont taxa relative to other dental types generally increases with the amount of open habitat," John Flynn explained in Scientific American (May 2007) "and the Tinguiririca level of hysodonty surpasses even that observed for mammals living in modern, open habitats such as the Great Plains of North America." Statistical analyses of the number of species categorized by body size ("cenogram" analysis, an aspect of body size scaling) and of their broad ecological niches ("macroniche" analysis) bears out the existence of dry grasslands. Previously, no grassland ecosystem anywhere had been identified prior to Miocene systems fifteen million years later than the Tinguiririca fauna. Grasslands spread as the Earth's paleoclimate grew cooler and drier.

New fossils were uncovered of the New World monkeys and caviomorph rodents— the group that includes the capybara— which are known not to have evolved in situ. Some of the new fossils demonstrate by the form of their teeth that they lie closer to African fossil relatives than to the North American ones, which previously had been assumed to have rafted to the island continent. Now it appears that some may have made the crossing of a younger, much narrower Atlantic Ocean. A notable discovery was the miniature skull of a delicate progenitor of New World marmosets and tamarins; it has been given the name Chilecebus carrascoensis.

The first of the fossils were found in 1988. Since then, in strata representing repeated catastrophic lahar events, more than 1500 individual fossils have been recovered from multiple sites in the region, ranging in age from 40 to 10 mya. The mammal species Archaeotypotherium tinguiriricaense is named after the site.

== See also ==
- South American land mammal age - list of fossils from this age and site
- Fossils of Chile
