= Chilecebus =

Chilecebus Temporal range: Early Miocene (Colhuehuapian) ~21.0–17.5 Ma

Scientific classification
- Kingdom: Animalia
- Phylum: Chordata
- Class: Mammalia
- Order: Primates
- Suborder: Haplorhini
- Family: Atelidae
- Genus: †Chilecebus
- Species: †C. carrascoensis

Binomial name
- †Chilecebus carrascoensis Flynn, Wyss, Charrier and Swisher, 1995

Extinct genus of monkeys

Chilecebus is an extinct genus of New World monkeys that lived in what is now Chile (Abanico Formation) during the Early Miocene some 20 million years ago. The type species is C. carrascoensis. It had a body mass of about 1,000 g (35 oz).

== See also ==
- List of fossil primates of South America
