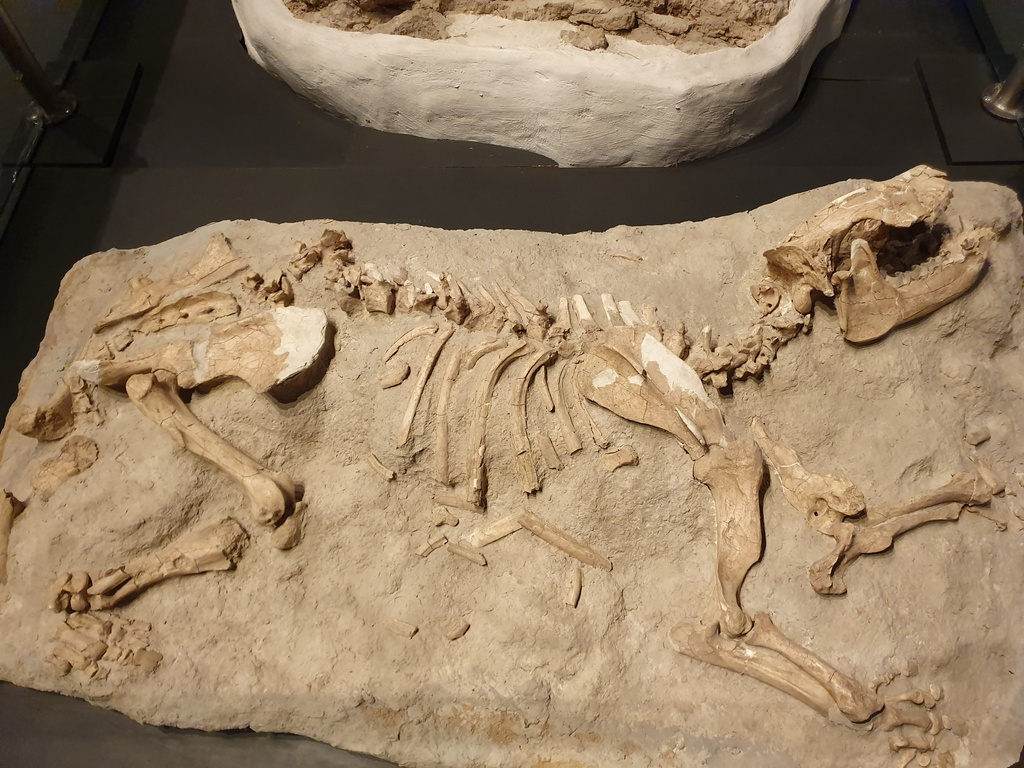
- Fossilized remains of Periphragnis exactus.

Scientific classification
- Kingdom: Animalia
- Phylum: Chordata
- Class: Mammalia
- Infraclass: Placentalia
- Order: †Notoungulata
- Family: †Isotemnidae
- Genus: †Periphragnis; Roth 1899

Type species
- †Periphragnis harmeri Roth, 1899

Species
- P. circunglexus Ameghino 1901; P. cristatus Roth 1904; P. exauctus Ameghino 1902; P. harmeri Roth 1899; P. palmeri Roth 1904; P. vicentei Bradham et al 2015

Synonyms
- Coelodontherium Roth 1903; Lemudeus Roth 1903; Proasmodeus Ameghino 1902; Tehuelia Roth 1902

= Periphragnis =

Periphragnis Temporal range: Middle Eocene-Early Oligocene ~48–29 Ma

Extinct genus of notoungulates

Periphragnis is an extinct genus of isotemnid notoungulates that lived from the Middle Eocene to the Early Oligocene in what is now Argentina and Chile.

== Description ==
This animal was of robust build, with powerful, probably digitigrade legs ending in hooves. The forelegs, particularly robust, shared similarities with those of its relative Thomashuxleya, but had less flattened ungulate phalanges. Periphragnis was approximately one meter and a half long, around the size of a modern boar. Its skull had a small neurocranium, and the dentition was complete and almost without any diastema. The canines were large-sized.

Periphragnis had multiple similarities with Thomashuxleya, but its teeth had a slightly higher crown, although still brachydont. The parastyle and paracon folds in the upper molars were less prominent, as well as less distinctly separated; the folds of the parastyle, in the upper teeth of the jugal area, intersected with the labial metastyle of the previous teeth. The second lower premolar was more complex than in Thomashuxleya, with a well-developed posterolingual sulcus; the lower premolars were generally shorter and relatively wider, while the set of incisors was positioned more transversely.

== Classification ==
The genus Periphragnis was first described in 1899 by Santiago Roth, based on fossils found around Lago Musters, in Argentina, in terrains dated from the Middle Eocence. The type species is Periphragnis harmeri. Other species of early notoungulates from the same geological horizon and the same area, such as Asmodeus armatus, Tehuelia regia and Thomashuxleya rankei, were later recognized as synonymous with Periphragnis harmeri. Other species attributed to the genus are P. circunflexus, from the Middle-Late Eocene of Argentina, P. exauctus and P. palmeri, both from the Late Eocene of Argentina, and P. vicentei, from the Early Oligocene of Tinguiririca, Chile.

Periphragnis has historically been considered a rather derived member of the Isotemnidae, a group of archaic notoungulates with a massive build. For some of the characteristics of its limbs, Periphragnis has been compared to the Homalodotheriidae, and some researchers thinks it was a basal form from this group. Recently, the status of Isotemnidae as a monophyletic group has been discussed, and Periphragnis is considered a basal toxodont along with Thomashuxleya.

== Palaeobiology ==
Like several other isotemnids, Periphragnis fed on roots and tubers he dug up with his powerful legs and minced with his strong front teeth. The characteristics of the molars and incisors indicate that this animal may have been a grazer.

== Bibliography and References ==
- S. Roth. 1899. Aviso preliminar sobre mamíferos mesozóicos encontrados en Patagonia [Preliminary notice on Mesozoic mammals found in Patagonia]. Revista del Museo de La Plata 9:381-388
- F. Ameghino. 1901. Notices préliminaires sur des ongulés nouveaux des terrains crétacés de Patagonie [Preliminary notes on new ungulates from the Cretaceous terrains of Patagonia]. Boletin de la Academia Nacional de Ciencias de Córdoba 16:349-429
- F. Ameghino. 1902. Notices préliminaires sur des mammifères nouveaux des terrains Crétacé de Patagonie {preliminary notes on new mammals from the Cretaceous terrains of Patagonia]. Boletin de la Academia Nacional de Ciencias de Córdoba 17:5-70
