= Ignigena =

Ignigena Temporal range: Early Eocene (Casamayoran) ~54–51 Ma

Scientific classification
- Domain: Eukaryota
- Kingdom: Animalia
- Phylum: Chordata
- Class: Mammalia
- Order: †Notoungulata
- Family: †Interatheriidae
- Genus: †Ignigena; Hitz, Flynn & Wyss 2006

Type species
- Ignigena minisculus Hitz, Flynn & Wyss 2006

Extinct genus of notoungulates

Ignigena is an extinct genus of notoungulate belonging to the family Interatheriidae. The only known species of this genus is Ignigena minisculus. The genus name means born from the fire, referencing the volcanic deposits in which its fossils were found, while the type species name minisculus means "minuscule", referencing the small size of the animal. It was related to Johnbell. I. minisculus was a small animal with elongated teeth. Its fossilized remains were found in Chile, in deposited dating to the Early Eocene.
