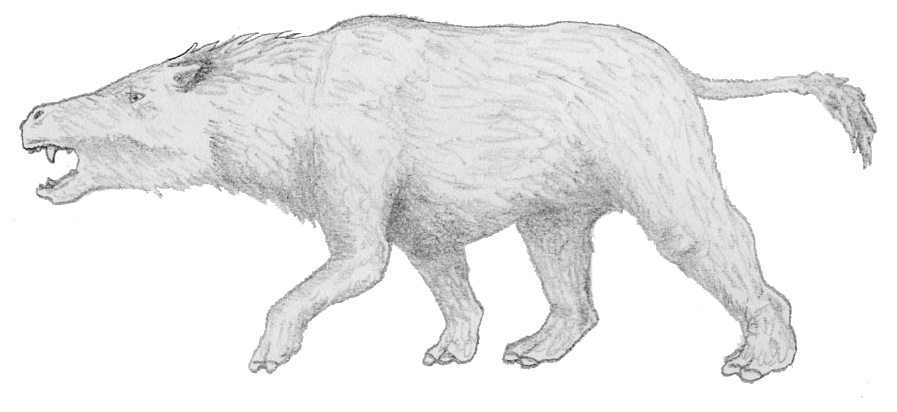
- Thomashuxleya

Scientific classification
- Kingdom: Animalia
- Phylum: Chordata
- Class: Mammalia
- Order: †Notoungulata
- Suborder: †Toxodontia
- Family: †Isotemnidae; Ameghino 1897

Genera
- †Anisotemnus; †Coelostylodon; †Distylophorus; †Hedralophus; †Isotemnus; †Itaboraitemnus; †Lophocoelus; †Maizotemnus; †Pampatemnus; †Periphragnis; †Pleurocoelodon; †Pleurostylodon; †Rhyphodon; †Thomashuxleya

= Isotemnidae =

Isotemnidae Temporal range: Late Paleocene-Middle Miocene (Itaboraian-Laventan) ~59.0–11.8 Ma

Extinct family of mammals

Isotemnidae is a paraphyletic extinct family of notoungulate mammals known from the Early Eocene (Itaboraian) to Middle Miocene (Honda Group, Laventan) of South America.
