= Archaeotypotherium =

Archaeotypotherium Temporal range: Oligocene (Tinguirirican-Deseadan) ~29–28.4 Ma

Scientific classification
- Domain: Eukaryota
- Kingdom: Animalia
- Phylum: Chordata
- Class: Mammalia
- Order: †Notoungulata
- Family: †Archaeohyracidae
- Genus: †Archaeotypotherium; Roth 1903

Type species
- †Archaeotypotherium transitum Roth, 1903

Species
- A. pattersoni Croft et al 2003; A. tinguiriricaense Croft et al 2003; A. transitum Roth 1903

Extinct genus of mammals

Archaeotypotherium is an extinct genus of notoungulate belonging to the family Archaeohyracidae that lived during the Oligocene of Argentina and Chile. It was first described in 1903 by the Argentine paleontologist Santiago Roth.
