= Rhyphodon =

Rhyphodon Temporal range: Middle Eocene-Late Eocene ~45–34 Ma

Scientific classification
- Domain: Eukaryota
- Kingdom: Animalia
- Phylum: Chordata
- Class: Mammalia
- Order: †Notoungulata
- Family: †Isotemnidae
- Genus: †Rhyphodon; Roth 1899

Type species
- †Rhyphodon lankesteri Roth, 1899

Species
- R. angusticephalus Roth 1904; R. lankesteri Roth 1899

Synonyms
- Lemudeus proportionalis Roth 1904; Pehuenia insigna Roth 1904; Pehuenia wehrlii Ameghino 1902; Setebos terribilis Roth 1902

Extinct genus of mammals

Rhyphodon is an extinct genus of notoungulate, who lived from the Middle to the Late Eocene in what is today South America.

== Description ==
This genus is only known from cranial remains, but by comparing it with some of its better known relatives, it is possible to reconstruct its appearance. Rhyphodon probably was a medium-sized herbivore, the size of a large dog. The skull, more than 20 centimeters long, had a relatively short muzzle and a primitive and complete set of teeth. The teeth shared similarities with those of its relative Periphragnis, from which they were distinguished by a lack of cingulum and a greater coverage of wrinkled enamel on the molars.

A fossil attributed to Rhyphodon preserves an endocranial cast, allowing researchers to reconstruct the shape of various structures of the animal brain; the endocranium was similar to other archaic ungulates such as Phenacodus and Notostylops, but with some observable differences. Rhyphodon had slightly smaller olfactory bulbs than the basal notoungulate Notostylops, and those were folded downward. The cerebellum was larger and as broad as it was long, while the piriform lobes were laterally expanded. Compared to Notostylops, the cerebral hemispheres were less convoluted. There was no separate optic canal and no posterolateral cerebral venous canal.

== Classification ==
The genus Rhyphodon was first described in 1899 by Santiago Roth, based on fossil remains initially thought to be dating from the Cretaceous and only later recognized as dating back to the Eocene. The type species, Rhyphodon lankesteri was discovered near Lago Musters in Patagonia in Late Eocene terrains. An earlier species, Rhyphodon angusticephalus, is known from the Cañadón Colorado, in the Chubut Province of Argentina.

Rhyphodon has been historically placed within the family Isotemnidae, the earliest and least specialized known family of toxodonts. However, this group may have been paraphyletic, and constituted of various forms more or less specialized within Toxodonta; according to a 2011 study, Rhyphodon is related to the genus Pampahippus.

== References and bibliography ==
- G. G. Simpson. 1948. The beginning of the age of mammals in South America. Part I. Bulletin of the American Museum of Natural History 91:1-232
- G. G. Simpson. 1967. The beginning of the age of mammals in South America. Part II. Bulletin of the American Museum of Natural History 137:1-260
