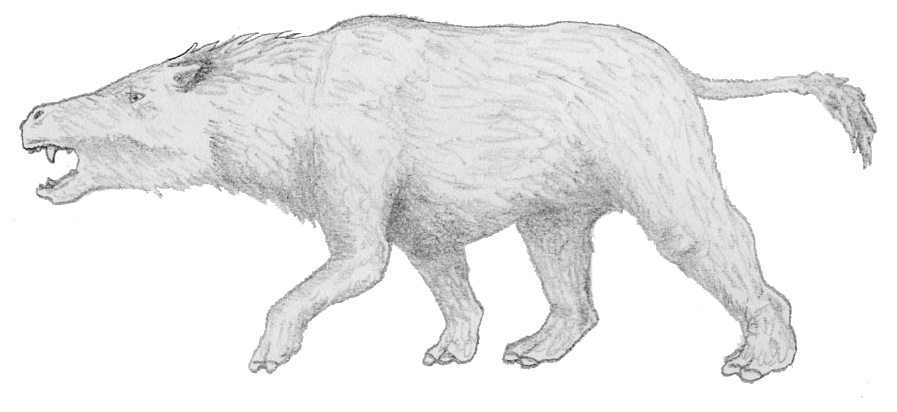

Scientific classification
- Domain: Eukaryota
- Kingdom: Animalia
- Phylum: Chordata
- Class: Mammalia
- Order: †Notoungulata
- Family: †Isotemnidae
- Genus: †Thomashuxleya; Ameghino 1901

Species
- T. rostrata Ameghino 1901 (type); T. externa Ameghino 1901

= Thomashuxleya =

Thomashuxleya Temporal range: Early Eocene (Casamayoran-Mustersan) ~48.6–48.0 Ma

Extinct genus of notoungulates

Thomashuxleya is an extinct genus of notoungulate mammal, named after famous 19th-century biologist Thomas Huxley.

== Description ==
Thomashuxleya was about 1.3 metres (4.3 ft) in length and weighted an estimated 113 kilograms (249 lb), with a heavy body and strong limbs. Its large skull had 44 teeth in its jaws, including large canines which may have been used to dig around in earth. It had four toes on each foot, and probably walked somewhat like a modern peccary. It was a relatively generalised animal, not specialised for any particular way of life. There's an almost complete skeleton of this animal in exhibition in the American Museum of Natural History. This skeleton was discovered during the Scarrit expedition to Patagonia, Argentina, that was led by the paleontologist George Gaylord Simpson. Fossils of Thomashuxleya have been found in the Sarmiento and Casamayor Formations of Argentina.
