= Pampatemnus =

Pampatemnus Temporal range: Early-Middle Eocene ~54–38 Ma

Scientific classification
- Kingdom: Animalia
- Phylum: Chordata
- Class: Mammalia
- Order: †Notoungulata
- Family: †Isotemnidae
- Genus: †Pampatemnus; Vucetich & Bond 1982

Type species
- †Pampatemnus infernalis Vucetich & Bond, 1982

Species
- P. deuteros Vucetich & Bond 1982; P. infernalis Vucetich & Bond 1982

Extinct genus of notoungulates

Pampatemnus is an extinct genus of notoungulate belonging to the family Isotemnidae that lived during the Early to Middle Eocene of what is now Argentina.

== Etymology ==
The genus name, Pampatemnus, is composed of the prefix Pampa-, the Quechua word for "plain", and the suffix -temnus, from the Greek word Τεμγυς, meaning "groove", a suffix commonly used by Florentino Ameghino to name genera of Isotemnidae.

== Description ==
Pampatemnus was discovered in outcrops of the Lumbrera Formation, an Eocene geological formation located in the Guachipas Department of the Salta Province. Two species attributed to the genus have been described : Pampatemnus infernalis and Pampatemnus deuterus. The species name infernalis was given to honor the Legion Infernal, a gaucho regiment who took an important role in the Spanish American wars of independence, while the name deuterus refers to the two species discovery order.
