= Pleurostylodon =

Pleurostylodon Temporal range: Middle Eocene ~48–34 Ma

Scientific classification
- Kingdom: Animalia
- Phylum: Chordata
- Class: Mammalia
- Order: †Notoungulata
- Family: †Isotemnidae
- Genus: †Pleurostylodon; Ameghino 1897

Type species
- †Pleurostylodon modicus Ameghino, 1897

Species
- P. complanatus Ameghino 1902; P. crassiramis Ameghino 1902; P. modicus Ameghino 1897; P. recticrista Ameghino 1904; P. similis Ameghino 1901

Synonyms
- Anchistrum Roth 1903; Coelostylops Roth 1903; Dialophus Ameghino 1902; Parastylops Roth 1902; Paratemnus Roth 1902; Porotemnus Roth 1902; Tychostylops Roth 1902

Extinct genus of mammals

Pleurostylodon is an extinct genus of notoungulate belonging to the family Isotemnidae. It lived during the Middle Eocene, in what is now Argentina.

== Description ==
This genus is known from numerous remains, mainly cranial, allowing to reconstruct its morphology. It was approximately the size of a medium dog, with an appearance evocating a badger or a hyrax.

Pleurostylodon had a large skull, widening in the orbital arch area, and narrowing in the posterior area of the muzzle, whose terminal part was enlarged and had small incisors; there was no diastema after the canines. The muzzle was shorter than in more derived and specialized toxodonts such as Adinotherium, and the occipital area was narrower. Several characteristics of its maxilla, of its teeth and of its unspecialized auditory region evocates Homalodotherium.

The third upper incisor was enlarged, and vaguely resembling a canine, while the canine was larger and lanceolate. The premolars and molars had an external edge outside the sinuous protoloph, with a strong parastyle and a fold of the paracon. The protoloph and metaloph were complete, except in the first upper premolar, while the protocon and the hypocon were separated in the non-worn teeth. A sort of hook and several small crests were present in variable numbers in the median valley of the molars.

Among notoungulates, Pleurostylodon modicus had a notably low daily enamel secretion rate and enamel extension rate, and its enamel formation front angle was relatively high compared to other members of the order.

== Classification ==
The genus Pleurostylodon was first described in 1897 by Florentino Ameghino, based on fossil remains found in Argentina in Middle Eocene terrains. The type species is Pleurostylodon modicus, but Ameghino described numerous other species in subsequent years, including P. complanatus, P. crassiramis, P. recticrista, P. similis.

Pleurostylodon is one of the better known genera of the family Isotemnidae, a group of basal notoungulates comprising numerous relatively unspecialized genera of variable size. The Isotemnidae family is considered by some to be paraphyletic, in which case Pleurostylodon may be closer to the basis of Toxodontia, which includes various derived genera such as Toxodon.

== Bibliography ==
- F. Ameghino. 1897. Mammiféres crétacés de l'Argentine (Deuxième contribution à la connaissance de la fauna mammalogique de couches à Pyrotherium) [Cretaceous mammals of Argentina (second contribution to the knowledge of the mammalian fauna of the Pyrotherium Beds)]. Boletin Instituto Geografico Argentino 18(4–9):406-521
- F. Ameghino. 1901. Notices préliminaires sur des ongulés nouveaux des terrains crétacés de Patagonie [Preliminary notes on new ungulates from the Cretaceous terrains of Patagonia]. Boletin de la Academia Nacional de Ciencias de Córdoba 16:349-429
- F. Ameghino. 1902. Notices préliminaires sur des mammifères nouveaux des terrains Crétacé de Patagonie {preliminary notes on new mammals from the Cretaceous terrains of Patagonia]. Boletin de la Academia Nacional de Ciencias de Córdoba 17:5-70
- F. Ameghino. 1904. Nuevas especies de mamíferos, cretáceos y terciarios de la República Argentina [New species of mammals, Cretaceous and Tertiarty, from the Argentine Republic]. Anales de la Sociedad Cientifica Argentina 56–58:1-142
- G. G. Simpson. 1967. The beginning of the age of mammals in South America. Part II. Bulletin of the American Museum of Natural History 137:1-260
- G. Billet. 2011. Phylogeny of the Notoungulata (Mammalia) based on cranial and dental characters. Journal of Systematic Palaeontology. 9 (4): 481–97. doi:10.1080/14772019.2010.528456. OCLC 740994816.
