= Pseudhyrax =

Pseudhyrax Temporal range: late Eocene-Early Oligocene ~38–33 Ma

Scientific classification
- Kingdom: Animalia
- Phylum: Chordata
- Class: Mammalia
- Order: †Notoungulata
- Family: †Archaeohyracidae
- Genus: †Pseudhyrax; Ameghino, 1901

Type species
- †Pseudhyrax eutrachytheroides Ameghino, 1901

Species
- P. eutrachytheroides Ameghino 1901; P. strangulatus Ameghino 1901

Synonyms
- Degonia kollmanni Roth 1902; Pseudopithecus modestus Roth 1902; Rankelia elegans Roth 1902; Trimerostephanos cuneolus Ameghino 1901

Extinct genus of mammals

Pseudhyrax is an extinct genus of archaeohyracid notoungulate. It lived from the Late Eocene to the Early Oligocene, of what is now South America.

== Description ==
This animal was approximately the size of a modern raccoon, and its skull was approximately 13 centimeters long. The length of its body, excluding the tail, was approximately 65–75 centimeters, and it weighed around 7–9 kilograms. Pseudhyrax had a low and elongated skull, mainly characterized by its dentition. The premolars and molars of Pseudhyrax were particularly high-crowned (hypsodont).

== Classification ==
The genus Pseudhyrax was first described in 1901 by Florentino Ameghino, based on fossil remains found in Argentina in terrains dated from the Late Eocene. The type species is Pseudhyrax eutrachytheroides, and the species P. strangulatus was also named by Ameghino. The name Pseudhyrax ("false hyrax") reflects Ameghino's belief that this animal was related to hyraxes, due to the shape of its skull. The species name of the type species, eutrachytheroides, means "similar to Eutrachytherus", another genus of notoungulate currently considered as a synonym of Trachytherus.

Pseudhyrax is traditionally considered a member of Archaeohyracidae, a clade of notoungulates sharing similarities with the modern rock hyrax, but larger in size and with hypsodont teeth. The family Archaeohyracidae, however, may be paraphyletic, and some of its members may be basal to other groups of typotheres.

== Paleoecology ==
Pseudhyrax was a terrestrial animal, probably fast and agile, and perhaps social. It was herbivorous and its high-crowned premolars and molars indicates that it was able to feed on hard and abrasive plants in open areas.

== Bibliography ==
- F. Ameghino. 1901. Notices préliminaires sur des ongulés nouveaux des terrains crétacés de Patagonie [Preliminary notes on new ungulates from the Cretaceous terrains of Patagonia]. Boletin de la Academia Nacional de Ciencias de Córdoba 16:349-429
- G. G. Simpson. 1967. The beginning of the age of mammals in South America. Part II. Bulletin of the American Museum of Natural History 137:1-260
- M. A. Reguero and F. J. Prevosti. 2010. Rodent-like notoungulates (Typotheria) from Gran Barranca, Chubut Province, Argentina: phylogeny and systematics. In R. H. Madden, A. A. Carlini, M. G. Vucetich, R. F. Kay (eds.), The Paleontology of Gran Barranca: Evolution and Environmental Change through the Middle Cenozoic of Patagonia 148–165
