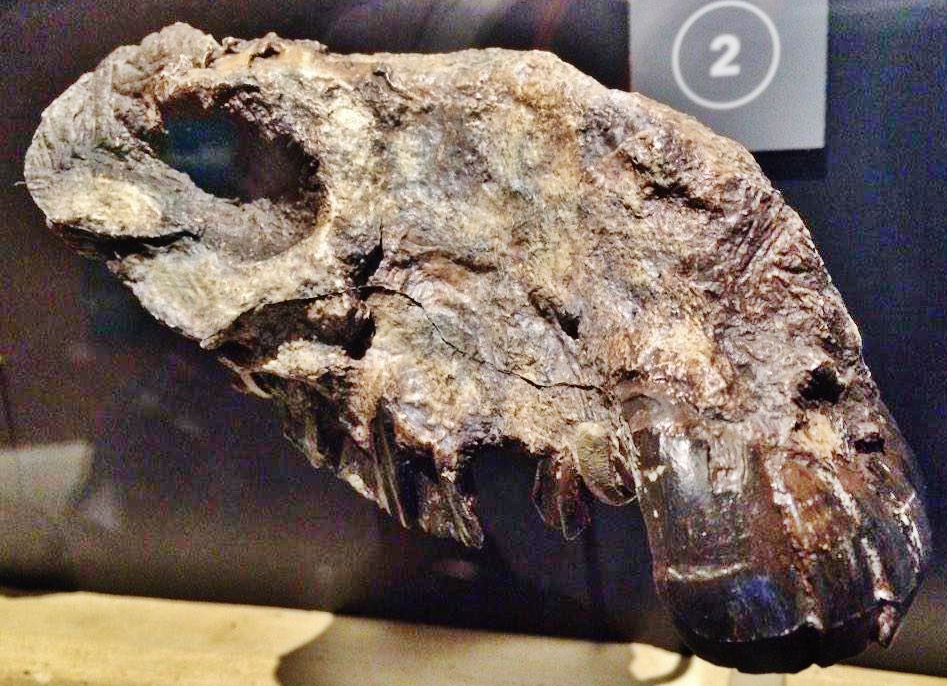
- Skull of Eomorphippus bondi

Scientific classification
- Kingdom: Animalia
- Phylum: Chordata
- Class: Mammalia
- Order: †Notoungulata
- Family: †Notohippidae
- Genus: †Eomorphippus; Ameghino 1901

Type species
- †Eomorphippus obscurus Ameghino 1901

Species
- E. bondi Wyss et al 2018; E. neilopdykei Wyss et al 2018; E. obscurus Ameghino 1901

Synonyms
- Eurystomus Roth 1901; Lonkus Roth 1902; Pleurystomus Ameghino 1902; Pseudostylops Ameghino 1901

= Eomorphippus =

Eomorphippus Temporal range: Late Eocene-Early Oligocene ~32–29 Ma

Extinct genus of mammals

Eomorphippus is an extinct genus of notohippid notoungulate that lived from the Late Eocene to the Early Oligocene in what is today South America.

== Description ==
This animal was approximately the size of a goat, with a build probably more robust. It had a heavy and sturdy skull, with a relatively short muzzle. The dentition was characterized by high-crowned (hypsodont) incisors, posterior premolars and molars. The teeth didn't have cementum. The upper incisors were slightly protruding forward. The third upper incisor was wider than the other two, while the fourth premolar was more molariform than the other premolars, but devoid of a distinct hypocone. The upper molars had hypocones, with a variable but generally deep fissure separating them from the protocones. The fissure was blocked by the medial projection of a hooked structure. Apart from the permanent major fossa, the other fossae are erased with wear.

== Classification ==
The genus Eomorphippus was first described in 1901 by Florentino Ameghino, based on fossil remains found in Patagonia, in terrains dated either from the Late Eocene or from the Early Oligocene. The type species is Eomorphippus obscurus, whose fossils have also been found in the Chubut Province. Two other species, E. bondi and E. neilopdykei, were both described in 2018, from remains found in Oligocene terrains from Chile. Another species, traditionally attributed to Eomorphippus, E. pascuali, was reassigned in the same 2018 study to the genus Rosendo.

Eomorphippus was a toxodont, a clade of notoungulates, that developed a remarkable diversity of forms during the Cenozoic. Eomorphippus has been historically included within the family Notohippidae, which included several genera whose hypsodont teeth were similar to those of horses. This family, however, is no longer considered monophyletic.

== Bibliography ==
- F. Ameghino. 1901. Notices préliminaires sur des ongulés nouveaux des terrains crétacés de Patagonie [Preliminary notes on new ungulates from the Cretaceous terrains of Patagonia]. Boletin de la Academia Nacional de Ciencias de Córdoba 16:349-429
- G. G. Simpson. 1967. The beginning of the age of mammals in South America. Part II. Bulletin of the American Museum of Natural History 137:1-260
