= Edward Hitchcock (disambiguation) =

Edward Hitchcock (1793–1864) was an American geologist and president of Amherst College.

Edward Hitchcock may also refer to:

- Edward Hitchcock Jr. (1828–1911), educator, son of the geologist
- Edward Griffin Hitchcock (1837–1898), Marshal of the Kingdom of Hawaii
