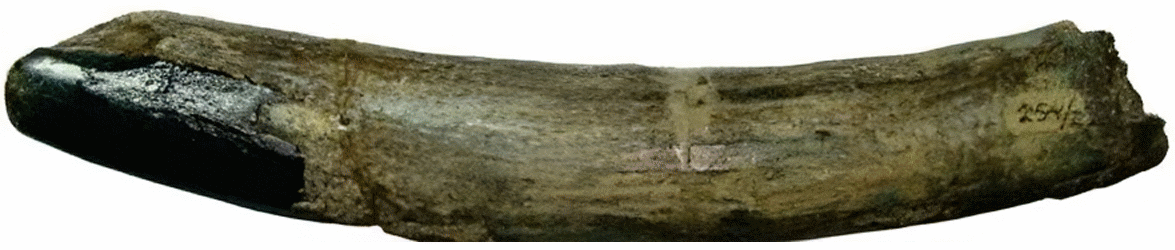
- Isolated tusk of Propyrotherium, specimen MJHG 254 Pa

Scientific classification
- Kingdom: Animalia
- Phylum: Chordata
- Class: Mammalia
- Order: †Pyrotheria
- Family: †Pyrotheriidae
- Genus: †Propyrotherium; Ameghino, 1901

Type species
- Propyrotherium saxeum Ameghino, 1901

Species
- P. saxeum Ameghino 1901

= Propyrotherium =

Propyrotherium Temporal range: Late Eocene ~37–34 Ma

Extinct genus of mammals

Propyrotherium is an extinct genus of mammals, belonging to the order Pyrotheria. It lived during the Late Eocene, in what is now South America.

== Description ==
This animal is only known from its fossilized dentition. From a comparison with its close relatives, it is supposed that it was a large herbivorous mammal, vaguely similar to an elephant and with massive limb; it was decidedly smaller than Pyrotherium but still of considerable size, and it is supposed that it was at least two meters long. It was endowed with incisors developed in elongated and forward pointed tusks, with a limited growth, and had large bilophodont molars.

The study of the dentition of Propyrotherium indicates that it had two premolars and three molars in both the maxilla and the mandible. The teeth gradually increased in size towards the back of the jaws, and the upper teeth gradually increased in the curvature of the ridges, as in Pyrotherium. Although they were bilophodont, the premolars possessed shorter anterior lophids than posterior ones, From the third upper premolar to the third upper molar the teeth were square-shaped and had three toots, while those from the third lower premolar to the third lower molar were longer than their width, with two roots and a vestigial oblique cristid. In many characteristics of its dentition, Propyrotherium differed from Griphodon and Baguatherium.

== Classification ==
Propyrotherium was first described by Florentino Ameghino in 1901, based on fossilized teeth found in Late Eocene rocks from the Chubut Province of Argentine Patagonia. Later findings allowed to realize a complete dental series and to carry cladistic analyzes; according to those researches, Propyrotherium was ranked as a basal member of the family Pyrotheriidae.

== Palaeobiology ==
=== Diet ===
P. saxeum had relatively shallow and round dental mesowear facets, suggesting that it was a frugivore.

== Bibliography and References ==
- F. Ameghino. 1901. Notices préliminaires sur des ongulés nouveaux des terrains crétacés de Patagonie [Preliminary notes on new ungulates from the Cretaceous terrains of Patagonia]. Boletin de la Academia Nacional de Ciencias de Córdoba 16:349-429
- G. G. Simpson. 1967. The beginning of the age of mammals in South America. Part II. Bulletin of the American Museum of Natural History 137:1-260
