= Frederick Loomis =

Frederick Loomis may refer to:

- Frederick Loomis (Canadian Army officer) (1870–1937), Canadian soldier
- Frederic Brewster Loomis (1873–1937), American paleontologist
