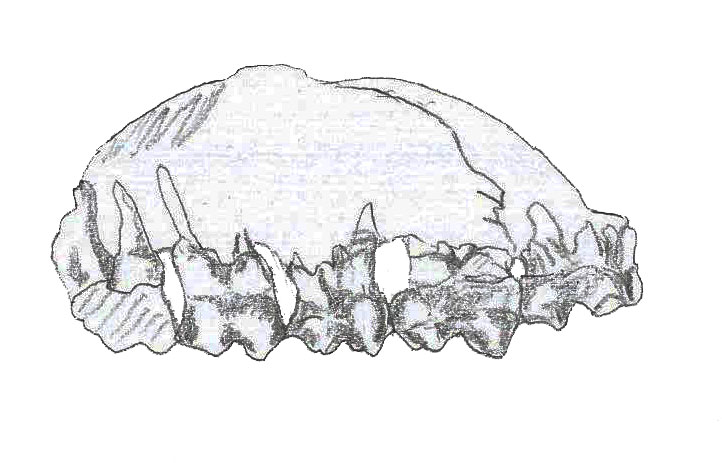
- Jawbone of Colombitherium tolimense

Scientific classification
- Kingdom: Animalia
- Phylum: Chordata
- Class: Mammalia
- Order: †Pyrotheria
- Family: †Colombitheriidae
- Genus: †Colombitherium; Hoffstetter, 1970

Type species
- Colombitherium tolimense Hoffstetter, 1970

= Colombitherium =

Colombitherium Temporal range: Late Eocene ~35–33 Ma

Extinct genus of mammals

Colombitherium is an extinct mammal from Late Eocene Colombia. It has originally been assigned to the order Pyrotheria and the family Colombitheriidae, although a later detailed analysis of the fossil questions that classification. A fossil jawbone of approximately 9 centimetres (3.5 in) length of Colombitherium has been found by Texas Petroleum in 1945, in the Upper Eocene strata of the middle Gualanday Group in the department of Tolima, Central Ranges of the Colombian Andes.

== Etymology ==
The genus Colombitherium means "beast from Colombia". The species epithet tolimense refers to the department of Tolima, where the type species has been found.

== Description ==
The genus is only known from a single jawbone with some teeth, found by Texas Petroleum in 1945, a specimen approximately 9 centimetres (3.5 in) in length, recovered from the Late Eocene middle part of the Gualanday Group on the San Pedro finca, Alto San José, Chaparral, Tolima. The teeth, molars and premolars of a kind known as bilophodont, which are present in the pyrotheres - were considered as evidence that this genus could be an ancestor of the advanced pyrotheres as Pyrotherium. Colombitherium has first been described by Hoffstetter in 1970, with a revised interpretation published by Billet et al. in 2010. The detailed descriptions by Billet et al. show the differences between Colombitherium and other pyrotherians: the features of the bilophodont teeth of Colombitherium are actually found in several groups of placental mammals, which implies that Colombitherium and another possibly related taxon, Proticia could not be part of Pyrotheria. The authors maintain "the referral of Colombitherium to Pyrotheria is therefore weakly supported, and it must be considered as highly hypothetical." In any case, the lack of further evidence means that Colombitherium and Proticia must be classified in a separate family, Colombitheriidae which is tentatively classified as a primitive clade in Pyrotheria.

Also the absolute age of the strata where the fossil jawbone has been found is questioned. The age has been originally defined by De Porta in 1962 on the basis of the pollen Verrucatosporites usmensis and Cicatricosisporites sp. The last occurrence of Echitriporites trianguliformis orbicularis indicates a Late Eocene to Early Oligocene age for the upper layers of the Gualanday Group.

== See also ==
- Pyrotherium, a similar mammal from the Late Oligocene of Argentina and Bolivia
