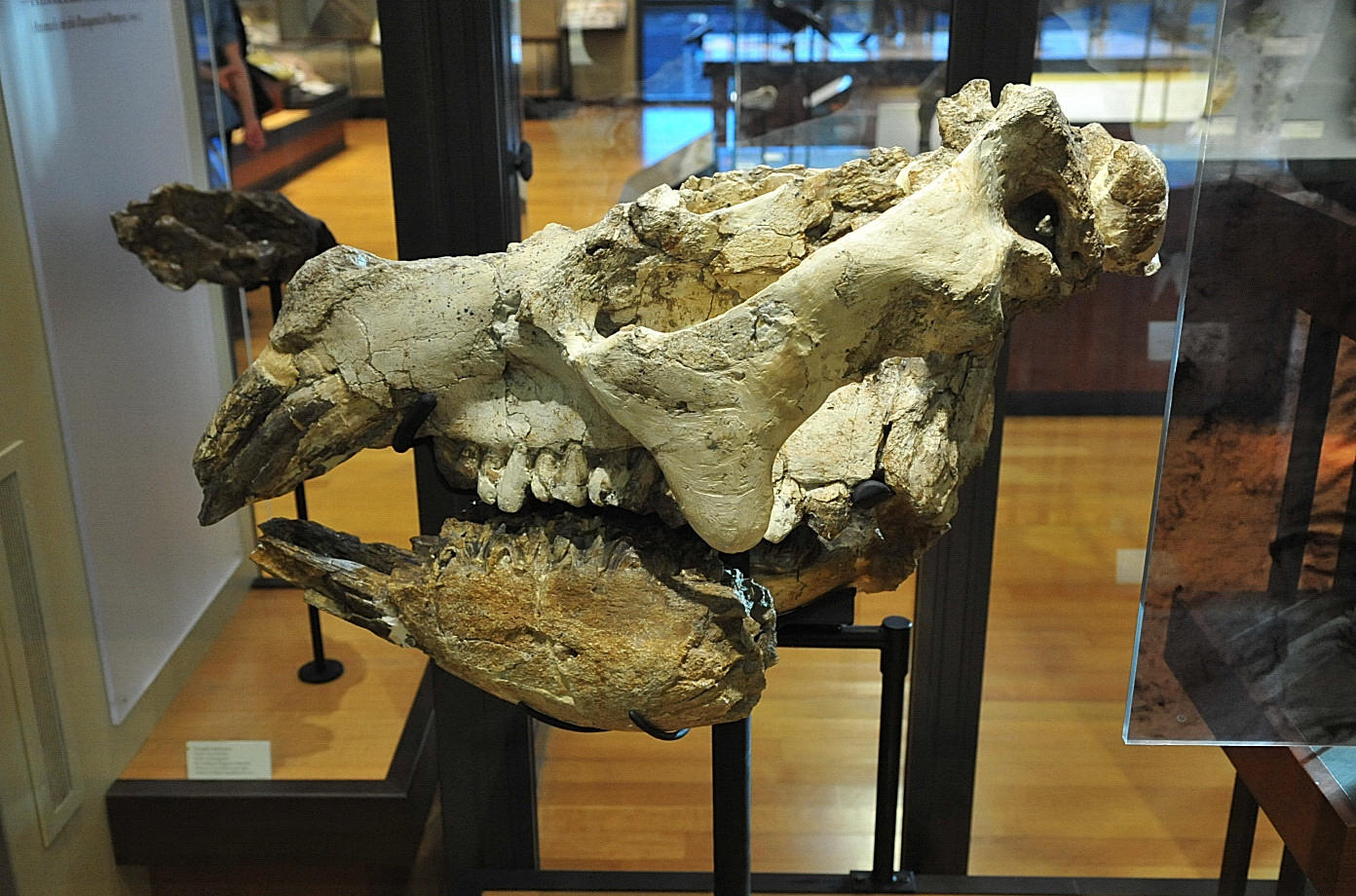
- Skull of Pyrotherium romeroi

Scientific classification
- Kingdom: Animalia
- Phylum: Chordata
- Class: Mammalia
- Order: †Pyrotheria
- Family: †Pyrotheriidae; Ameghino 1889

Genera
- †Baguatherium; †Berracotherium; †Carolozittelia; †Griphodon; †Propyrotherium; †Pyrotherium

= Pyrotheriidae =

Pyrotheriidae Temporal range: Mid Eocene-Early Oligocene (Casamayoran-Tinguirirican) ~48–28.4 Ma

Extinct family of mammals

Pyrotheriidae (from Ancient Greek πῦρ (pûr), meaning "fire", and θηρίον (theríon), meaning "beast") is the only family in the order Pyrotheria, provided one does not include the Paleocene genus, Carodnia. These extinct, elephant-like ungulates include the genera Baguatherium, Carolozittelia, Griphodon, Propyrotherium, and Pyrotherium. Fossils of the family have been found in Argentina, Brazil, Bolivia and Peru.
