= Edward Hitchcock Jr. =

American physical educator (1828–1911)

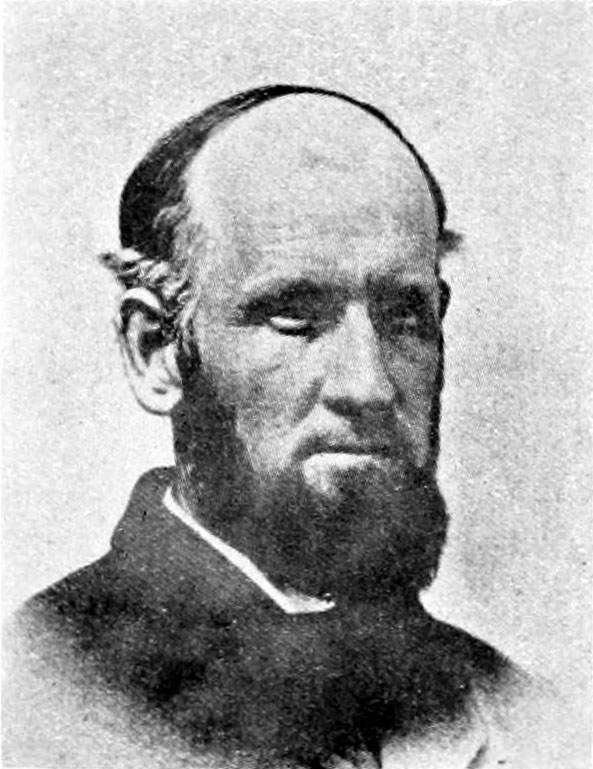
- Hitchcock in 1867

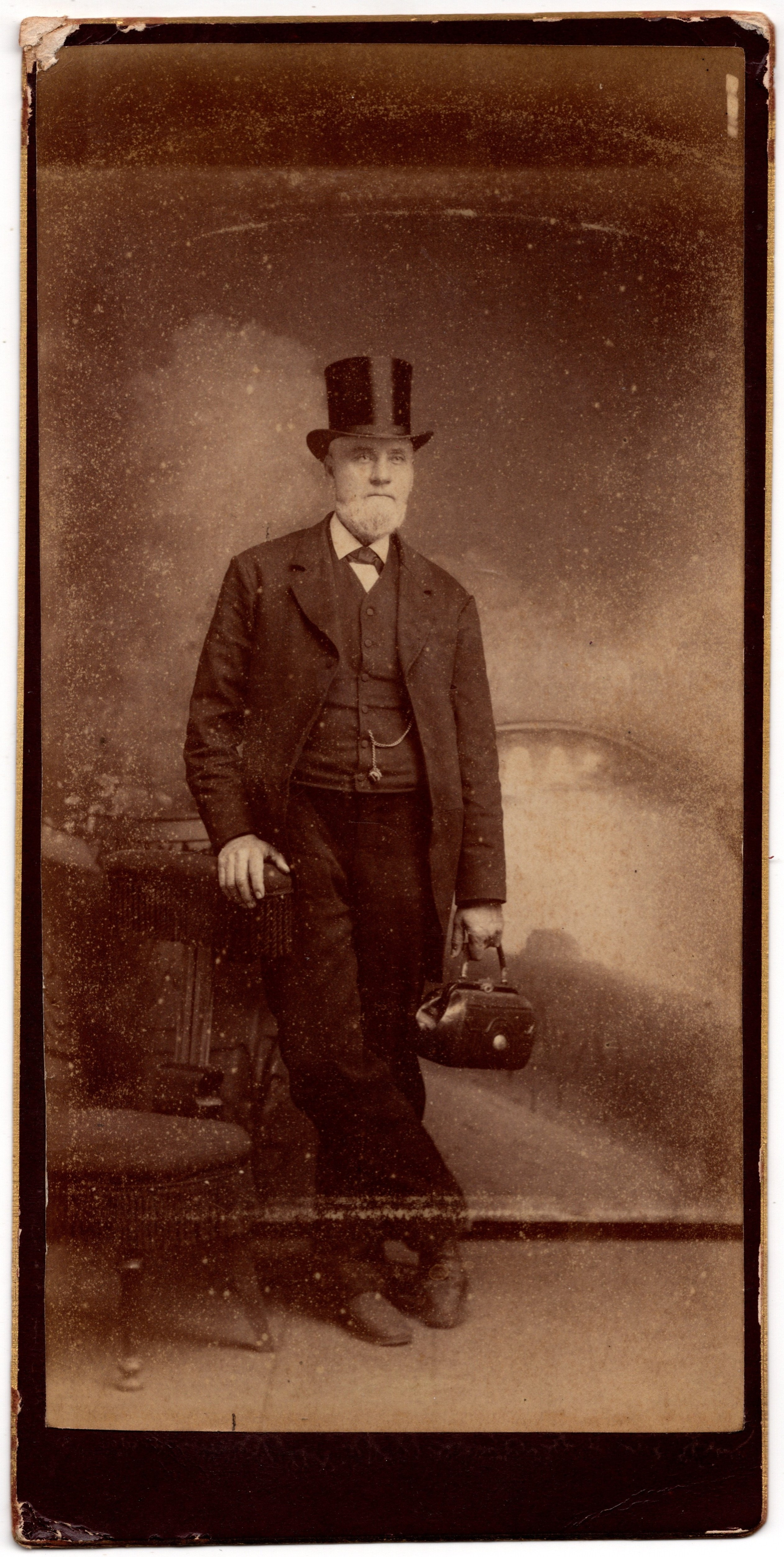
Dr. Edward Hitchcock Jr. holding doctors bag C. 1880s

Edward Hitchcock Jr. (May 23, 1828 – February 16, 1911) was an American physical educator.

== Biography ==
Born to Edward Hitchcock Sr., the geologist and President of Amherst College, and wife Orra White, Hitchcock attended Williston Seminary as a boy and continued his education while following in his father's footsteps by entering Amherst College in the fall of 1845. Hitchcock Jr. graduated from Amherst college in 1849. From 1850 to 1861, with the exception of a single year (1852–53), he was teacher of elocution and natural science at Williston Seminary. In 1853, he obtained the degree of doctor of medicine from the Harvard Medical School. The same year, after receiving his doctorate, he married Mary Judson. They had ten children; three of whom died in infancy. Hitchcock Jr. returned to Amherst College in 1861 as professor of Hygiene and Physical Education at the request of the college trustees, led by Nathan Allen, M.D., of Lowell, after the salutatorian and the valedictorian of the Class of 1859 died during their college course. Hitchcock Jr. was the first ever physical educator.

== History ==
Colleges had hired physical educators since the early 1820s, but Edward Hitchcock Jr. is generally credited with being the first formal physical educator at the collegiate level. He believed in the importance of sound physical health for college students, so that the mind could accomplish its best work and students could look forward to "the promised labor of a long life." To achieve that goal, he developed systems of physical training intended to appeal to the students both mentally and physically. His program at Amherst became a model for college and secondary school programs nationally and internationally. The development of this first college program was Hitchcock's major contribution to the field of physical education.

== Contributions ==
Edward Hitchcock Jr. contributed to Amherst College not only with his enlightened ideas concerning physical education, but also with his genuine personality. Hitchcock Jr. was noted as a kind, broad-minded, vigorous, optimistic, honest, faithfully religious man with shrewd common sense and an intense loyalty to the college. Students were known for being rather fond of Hitchcock Jr. as well, and he was often affectionately referred to as "Old Doc".

Old Doc is a noted "crusader for fitness" he created schedules for physical exercises to be completed at the college. While Edward Hitchcock Jr. actively practiced and taught physical education at Amherst, he also conducted research and intently studied the scientific functions that applied to his phys ed ideas. Hitchcock Jr. even worked with his aforementioned father Edward Hitchcock Sr to compile a textbook titled, Elementary Anatomy and Physiology For Colleges, Academies and Other Schools. He named one of the earliest dinosaurs discovered in America, Megadactylus polyzelus. Later it was reclassified as the type specimen of Anchisaurus polyzelus (ACM 41109), a prosauropod.

== Honors and awards ==
- Honorary Fellow in Memoriam, National Academy of Kinesiology
