= Orra White Hitchcock =

American botanical artist

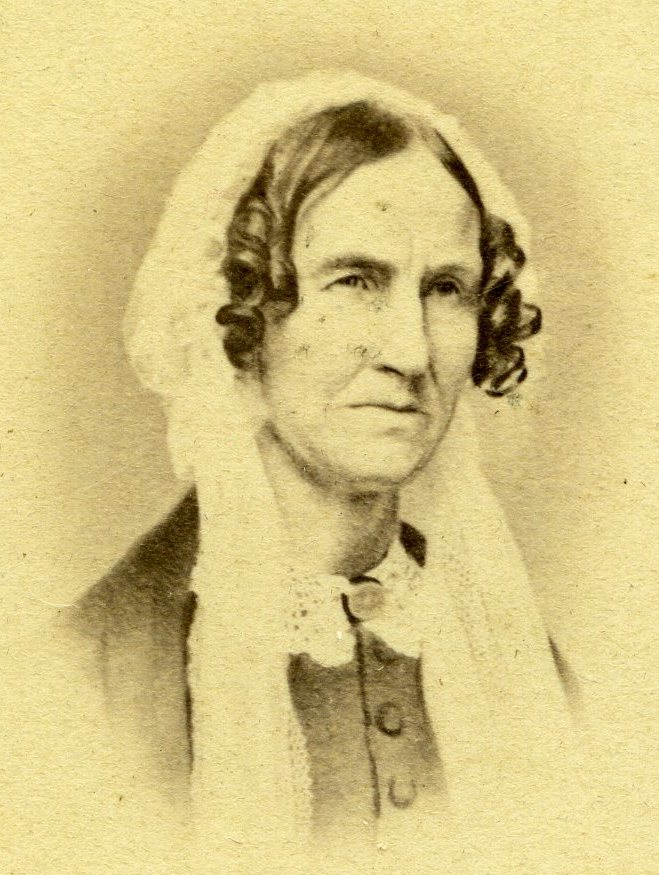
- Hitchcock, ca. 1860
- Born: Orra White; March 8, 1796; South Amherst, Massachusetts
- Died: May 26, 1863 (aged 67); Amherst, Massachusetts
- Known for: Botanical and scientific illustration; geological landscapes; lecture illustrations.
- Spouse: Edward Hitchcock

Orra White Hitchcock (March 8, 1796 – May 26, 1863) was one of America's earliest women botanical and scientific illustrators and artists, best known for illustrating the scientific works of her husband, geologist Edward Hitchcock (1793–1864), but also notable for her own artistic and scientific work.

== Life ==
Orra White was born to a prosperous farming family (Jarib and Ruth Sherman White) in South Amherst, Massachusetts. She was educated by a tutor and at two "ladies" schools, proved herself a child prodigy in numerous scientific and classical subjects, and showed early promise in drawing and painting. From 1813 to 1818 she taught young girls natural sciences, and the fine and decorative arts at Deerfield Academy. Her early training grounded her in both science and art, and she has been called the Connecticut River Valley's "earliest and most often published woman artist."

On May 31, 1821, Orra White married geologist Edward Hitchcock, principal of Deerfield Academy, minister, professor and third president of Amherst College. Hitchcock's art was integral to the work of her husband. She made hundreds of illustrations for Edward Hitchcock's scientific publications, including detailed landscapes of the Connecticut River Valley for his Massachusetts geological survey volumes, and custom designed charts that illustrated his local discoveries and his classroom lectures. In addition, she made detailed drawings of native flowers and grasses and small precise watercolors of small local mushrooms. Her work is a time-focused chronicle of the scenic, botanically and geologically diverse Connecticut River Valley in western Massachusetts. Orra White Hitchcock, a scientist in her own right, had the contemporary reputation as one of the valley's "most distinguished naturalists". In addition to being an artist and educator, she extended her influence beyond formal classrooms. Being often found participating in social and charity work.

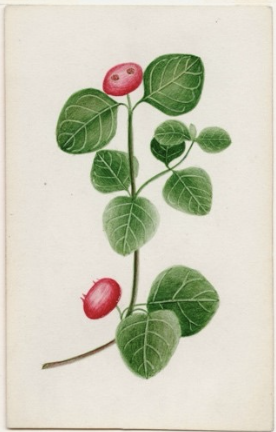
Water colour illustration of Partridgeberry, 1812 – 1854

Between 1817 and 1821 Hitchcock and her husband collected native plants for a conventional herbarium. At the same time, she created a 64-page album of watercolors of about 175 local flower and grass specimens for her Herbarium parvum, pictum. This painted herbarium is in the Deerfield Academy Archives.

In the summer and fall, she created a small watercolor album of native mushrooms and lichens, Fungi selecti picti. Edward Hitchcock labeled and catalogued the specimens. This painted album is in the Smith College Archives; a facsimile has been published by the Mortimer Rare Book Collection, Smith College.

== Landscapes and geological illustrations ==
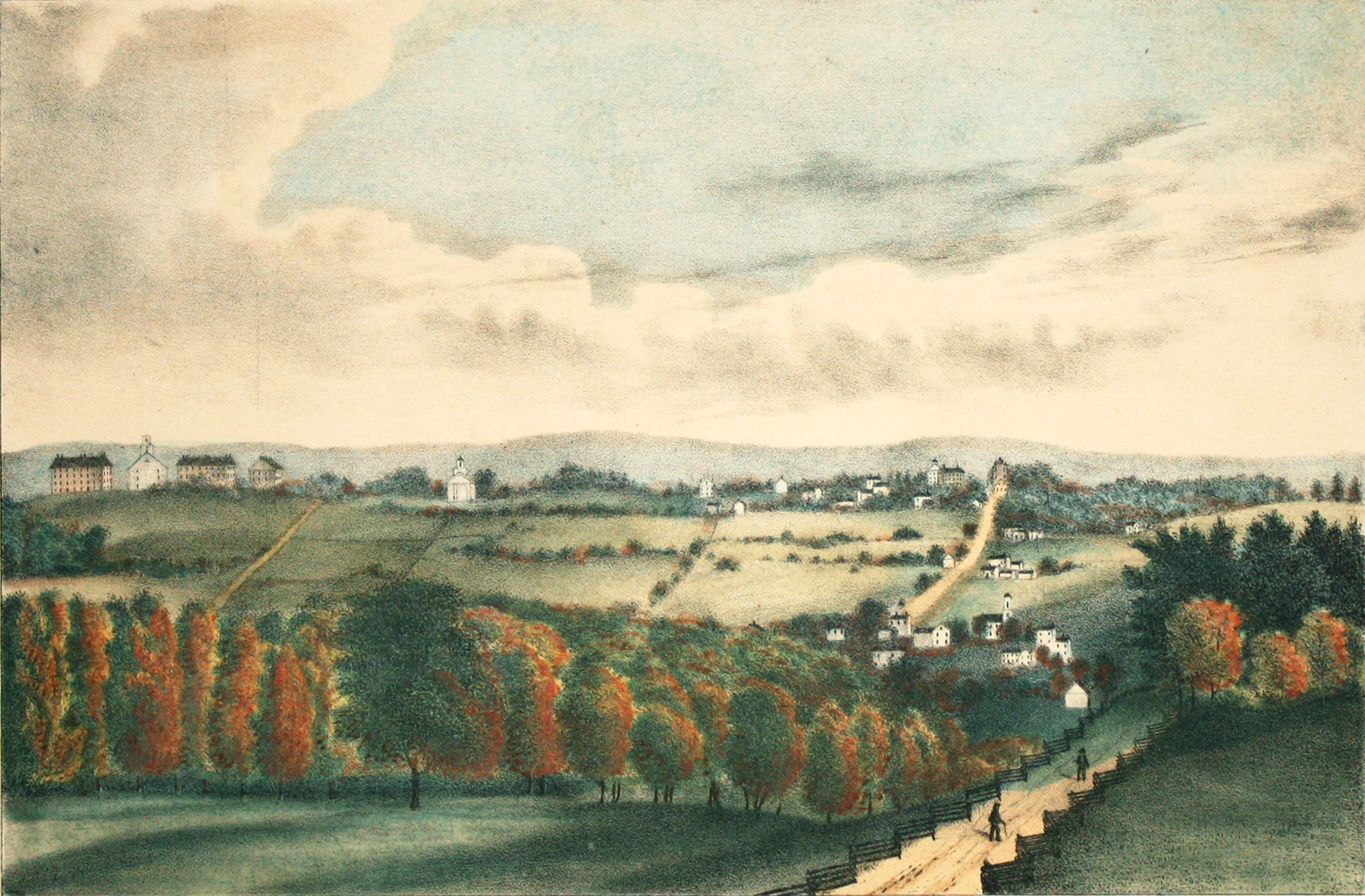
Autumnal Scenery, a landscape view of Amherst

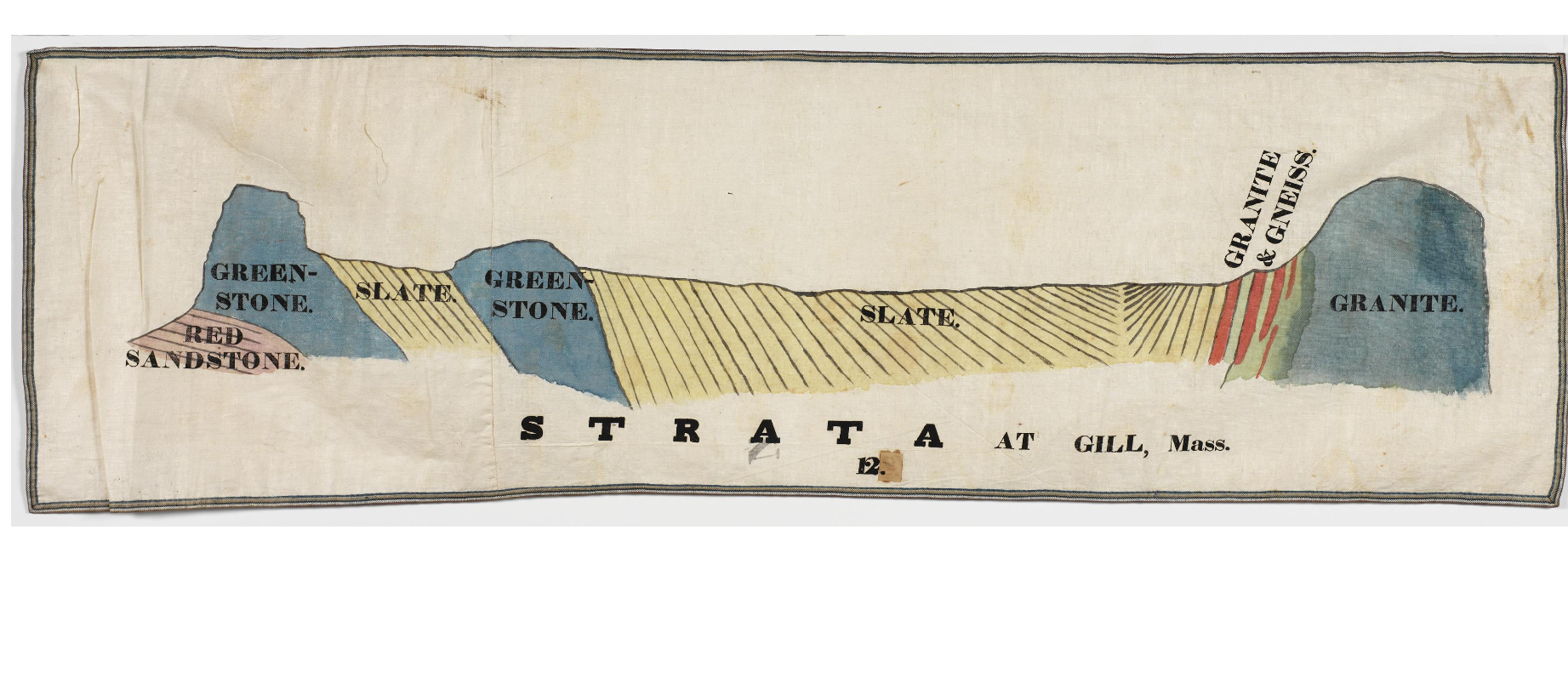
Strata, Gill, Massachusetts by Orra White Hitchcock, 1828–1840.

Hitchcock made drawings for more than 200 plates and 1,000 wood-engraved or woodcut illustrations for Edward's professional publications. The subjects included landscapes, geologic strata, specimens, and more. The most well known appear in her husband's seminal works, the 1833 Report on the Geology, Mineralogy, Botany, and Zoology of Massachusetts and its successor, the 1841 Final Report produced when he was State Geologist. For the 1833 edition, Pendleton's Lithography (Boston) lithographed nine of Hitchcock's Connecticut River Valley drawings and printed them as plates for the work. In 1841, B. W. Thayer and Co., Lithographers (Boston) printed revised lithographs and an additional plate. The hand-colored plate "Autumnal Scenery. View in Amherst" Hitchcock's most frequently seen work.

== Classroom drawings ==
Between 1828 and the 1840s, Hitchcock made hundreds of large and dramatic classroom charts of geologic cross-sections, prehistoric beasts (like the Megatherium), fossils and ichnological (later called dinosaur) footprints.

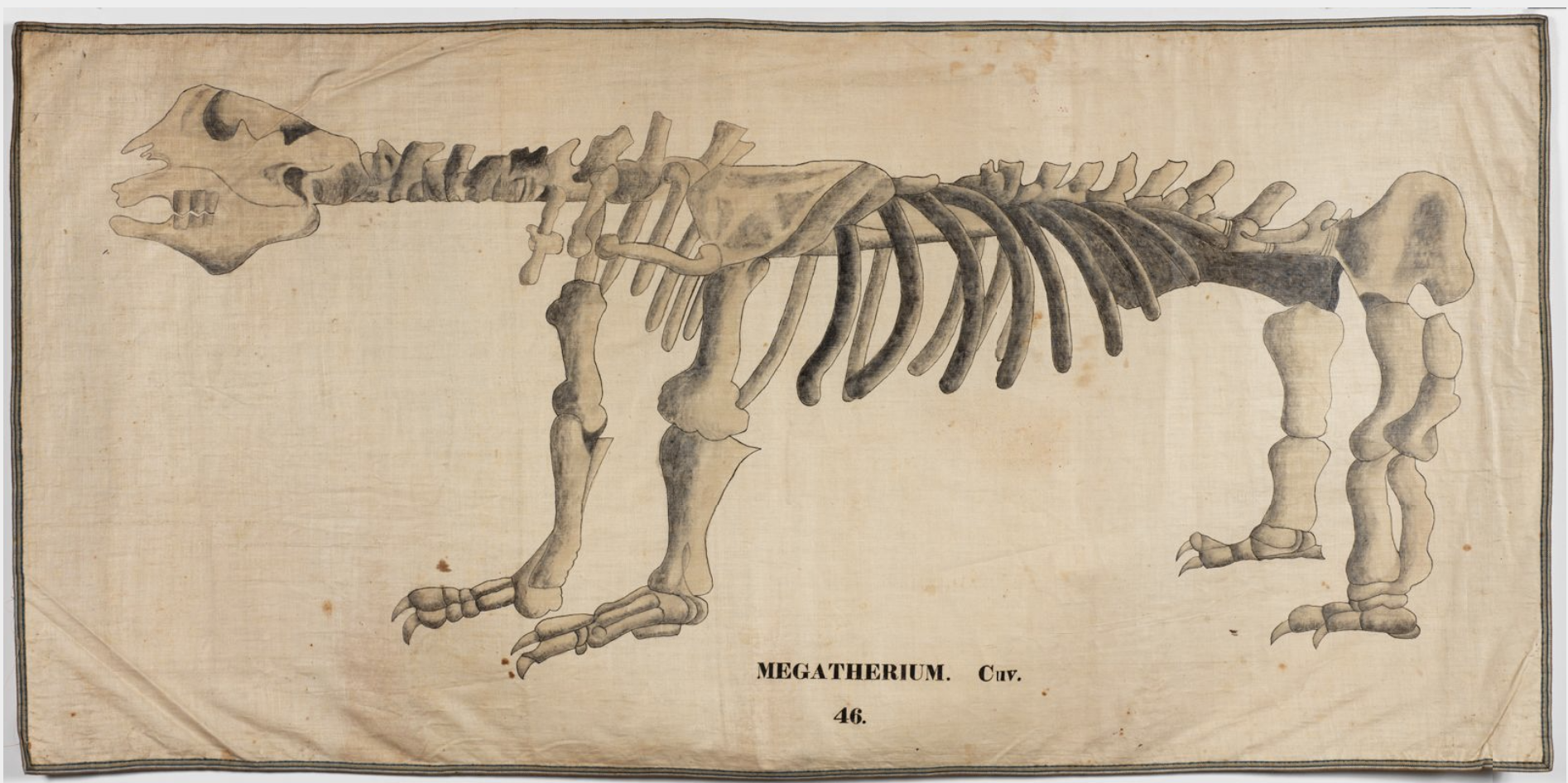
Orra White Hitchcock classroom drawing of megatherium skeleton 1828 – 1840

She copied scientific illustrations from contemporary works and made original illustrations of her husband's new ideas or discoveries, like Ornithichnites, He considered them "indispensable aids" for his lectures. The Amherst College Archives and Special Collections holds an extensive collection of classroom charts.

== Other works ==
Hitchcock's first documented published drawing is from an 1818 article by her husband in the periodical Port Folio. On rare occasions, she created illustrations for other scientists. Hitchcock's last documented work was her symbolic illustrations for her husband's Religious Lectures on Peculiar Phenomena in the Four Seasons, including an emblematic representation of spring and a stylized rainbow.

Edward acknowledged his wife's essential contributions to his work in the dedication of The Religion of Geology, citing her drawings as more powerful than his pen.

While published illustrations exist, only a small number of Hitchcock's original works survives. The Amherst College Archives and Special Collections has the most extensive documentation of her life and work, in the Edward and Orra White Hitchcock Papers and copies of all of Edward Hitchcock's scientific publications.

== Exhibitions ==
The Mead Art Museum at Amherst College held the first major retrospective exhibition of her work in 2011, "Orra White Hitchcock (1796-1863): An Amherst Woman of Art and Science," with a catalogue. In 2018, a solo exhibition of her work was featured at the American Folk Art Museum, entitled Charting the Divine Plan: The Art of Orra White Hitchcock (1796–1863)

== Major works illustrated ==
- Edward Hitchcock's article in the American Journal of Science
- Edward Hitchcock, Report on the Geology, Mineralogy, Botany, and Zoology of Massachusetts, (Amherst, Mass.: J.S. & C. Adams, 1833).
- Edward Hitchcock, Final Report on the Geology, Mineralogy, Botany and Zoology of Massachusetts, (Amherst, Mass.: J.S. & C. Adams; Northampton, Mass.: J. H. Butler, 1841).
- Edward Hitchcock, Sketch of the Scenery of Massachusetts. With Plates From the Geological Report of Prof. Hitchcock, (Northampton, Mass.: J.H. Butler, 1842).
- Edward Hitchcock. Religious Lectures on Peculiar Phenomena in the Four Seasons, (Amherst, Mass.: J.S. & C. Adams, 1850).

== Death ==
Orra White Hitchcock died of consumption (tuberculosis) on May 26, 1863, aged 67.

== See also ==
- Beneski Museum of Natural History, Amherst College
