= Samuel Appleton (merchant) =

American merchant and philanthropist (1766–1853)

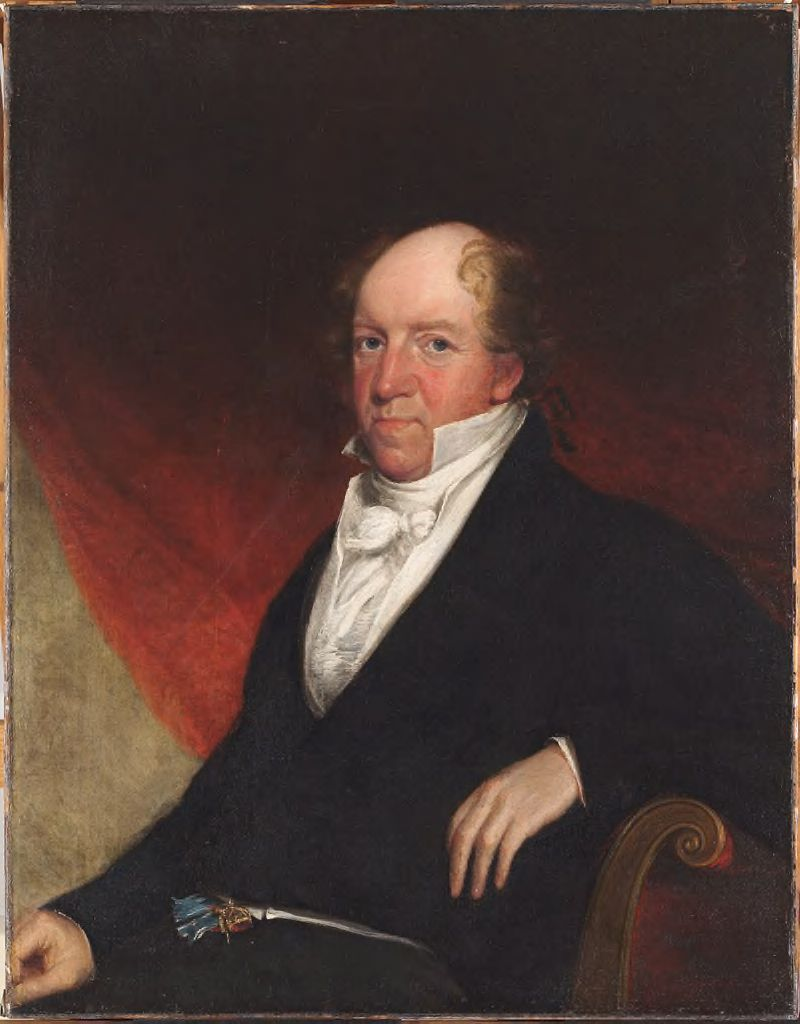
- 1818 portrait by Gilbert Stuart Newton

Member of the Boston Common Council from the 6th ward
- In office May 1, 1822 – May 1, 1823
- Preceded by: Office established
- Succeeded by: Joseph Stacy Hastings; Joel Prouty; John Stevens; William Wright

Personal details
- Born: June 22, 1766 New Ipswich, Province of New Hampshire, British America
- Died: July 12, 1853 (aged 87)
- Relatives: Appleton family
- Occupation: Merchant
- Known for: Philanthropy

Samuel Appleton (June 22, 1766 – July 12, 1853) was an American merchant and philanthropist, active in New Hampshire, Massachusetts, and Great Britain.

== Early life and education ==
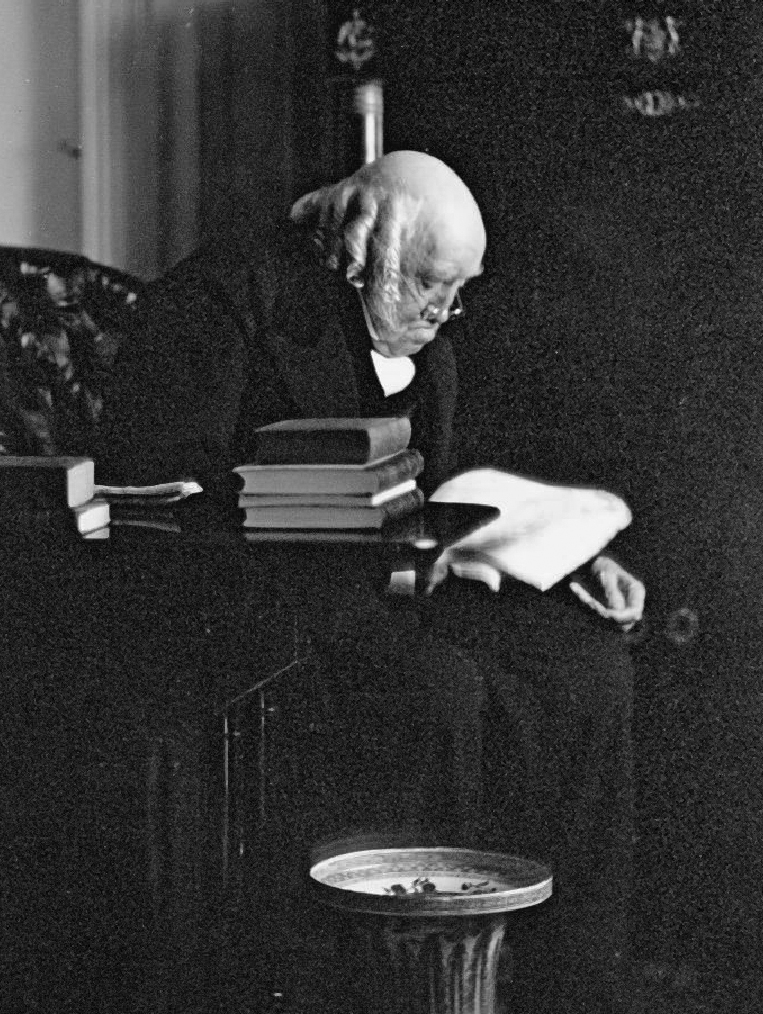
Appleton, circa 1850

Coat of Arms of Samuel Appleton

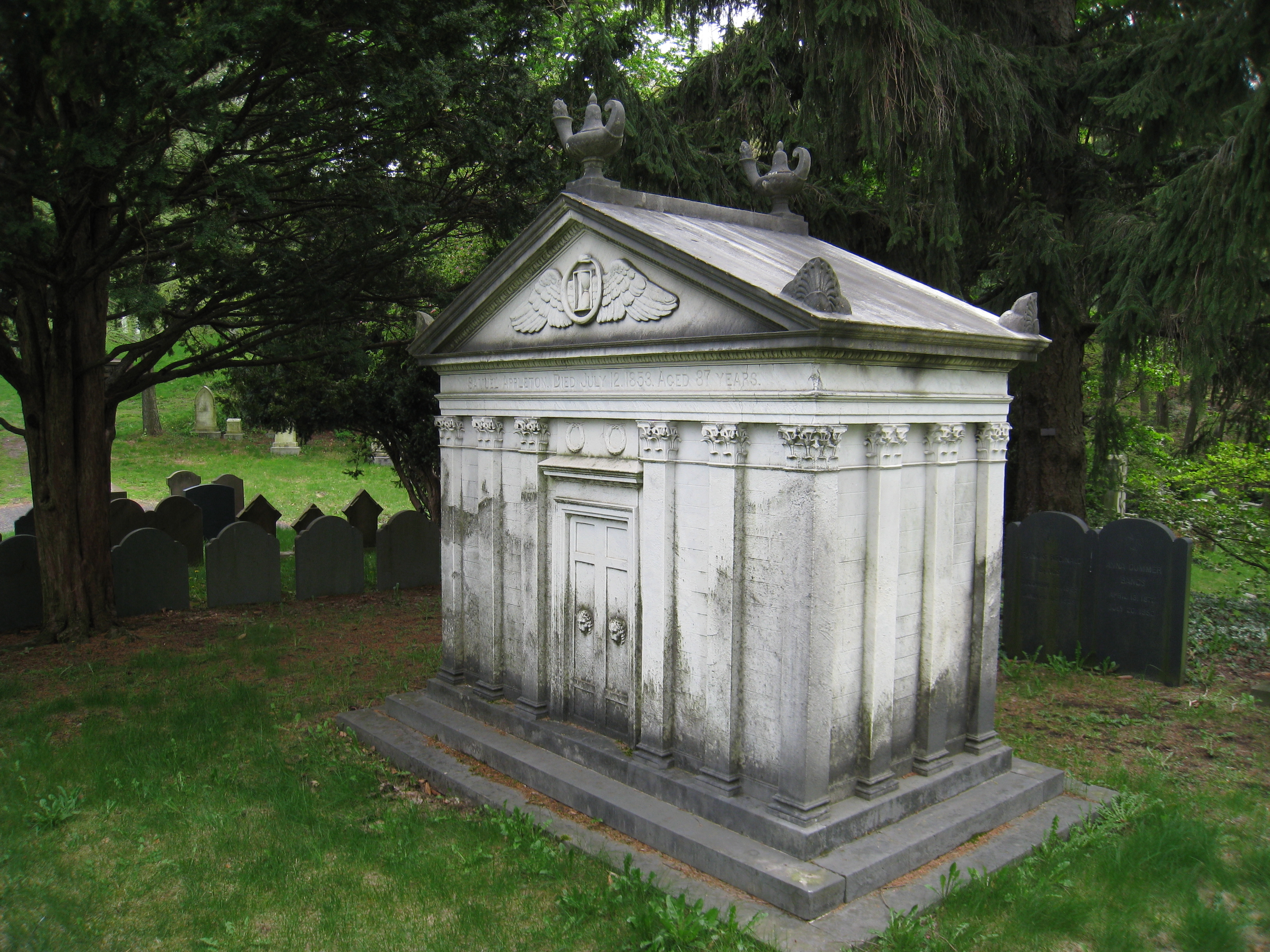
Appleton's tomb in Mount Auburn Cemetery

Samuel Appleton was born on June 22, 1766 in New Ipswich, New Hampshire. His great-great-grandfather, also named Samuel Appleton (1625–1696), was a military and government leader in the Massachusetts Bay Colony and Province of Massachusetts Bay who commanded the Massachusetts militia during King Philip's War at the attack on Hatfield, Massachusetts and the Great Swamp Fight. The elder Appleton was an opponent of Governor Edmund Andros and held numerous positions in government. His family relocated to Ipswich from Ipswich, Massachusetts.

== Career ==
From 1790 to 1792, Appleton cleared fields in Maine for farming. He also taught school and, for a time, he kept a store in Ipswich. In 1794, he moved to Boston, where he joined his brother Nathan as importers in the firm of S. & N. Appleton. The brothers bought European dry goods at auction, which they sold to country traders in exchange for homespun cloth and potash for export to Britain.

He later established cotton mills at Waltham and Lowell, Massachusetts. After 1799, he passed much of his time in Britain. At age 53, he married a widow, Mrs. Mary Gore; they had no children. He retired from business in 1823.

In 1822, Appleton served on the first Boston Common Council, representing the sixth ward.

== Retirement and charitable endeavors ==
After retirement, he devoted much of his fortune to charity, including gifts funding the Appleton Cabinet at Amherst College, built to house the Hitchcock Ichnological Cabinet, and the Appleton Chapel at Harvard University. He endowed the academy at New Ipswich with a permanent fund and founded a professorship of natural philosophy of Dartmouth College with a gift of $10,000.

Appleton was a vestryman of King's Chapel in Boston from 1830 to 1840, and a monument to him sits on the north wall of the chapel. Wilson's 1848 biographical directory of Boston businessmen noted it was “to the credit of Samuel Appleton, that he commenced life with a single four-pence half penny, paid to him by a drover who passed his father's house, for assistance in driving [cattle].”

== Death and legacy ==
At his death, Appleton's fortune amounted to nearly $1 million (approximately $29,700,000 in 2024), and he had given away nearly as much as that during his lifetime. In his will, he donated $200,000 (approximately $5,900,000 in 2024) “for scientific, literary, religious, and charitable purposes.”

The Samuel Appleton Building located on 110-114 Milk Street, Boston is currently under study as a Boston Landmark by the Boston Landmarks Commission.

The 1846 ship Samuel Appleton was built by P. Curtis in Medford, Massachusetts and owned by Daniel Pinckney Parker, a Boston shipping merchant.
