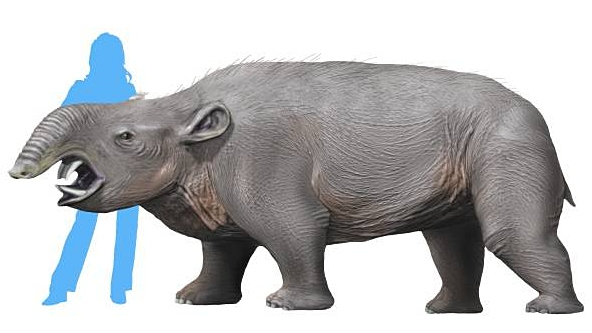
- Life reconstruction of Pyrotherium romeroi

Scientific classification
- Kingdom: Animalia
- Phylum: Chordata
- Class: Mammalia
- Clade: †Meridiungulata
- Order: †Pyrotheria; Ameghino, 1895

Families
- †Colombitheriidae; †Colombitherium; †Proticia; †Pyrotheriidae

= Pyrotheria =

Pyrotheres Temporal range: Early Eocene—Late Oligocene 56–23.03 Ma

Extinct order of mammals

Pyrotheria (from Ancient Greek πῦρ (pûr), meaning "fire", and θηρίον (theríon), meaning "beast") is an order of extinct meridiungulate mammals. These elephant-like ungulates include the genera Baguatherium, Carolozittelia, Colombitherium, Griphodon, Propyrotherium, Proticia, and Pyrotherium.

They had the appearance of large, plantigrade, tapir-like mammals with relatively short, slender limbs and five-toed feet with broad, flat phalanges. Their fossils are restricted to Paleocene through Oligocene deposits of Brazil, Peru and Argentina.

Some experts place the clade Xenungulata (which contains several genera, including Carodnia) within Pyrotheria, even when dentition, although bilophodont in both orders, is very different. For most scholars, the two orders remain separated. The dentition is complete with strong, procumbent, chisel-shaped incisors, strong sharp-pointed canines, and low-crowned cheek teeth with bilophodont molars. The affinities of the Xenungulata remain uncertain. Affinities with the Dinocerata are strongly supported by the dental characteristics. Initial study of the structure of the tarsus suggested that the xenungulates had a common ancestry with typical pyrotheres, such as Pyrotherium, but a more recent examination of the tarsus of Pyrotherium failed to support this, instead showing some traits shared by Pyrotherium and the Embrithopoda. As of 2004 it remains to be seen which of these views will turn out to be right. This means that the Pyrotheria could be members of no less than three major cladistic branches of placental mammals: Meridiungulata (if xenungulates are the closest relatives), Laurasiatheria (if dinoceratans are the closest relatives) and Afrotheria (if embrithopods are the closest relatives).

== Classification ==
- Colombitheriidae
  - Proticia
  - Colombitherium
- Pyrotheriidae
  - Pyrotherium
  - Griphodon
  - Propyrotherium
  - Carolozittelia
  - Baguatherium
  - Berracotherium
