= Frederic Brewster Loomis =

American paleontologist (1873–1937)

- Born: November 22, 1873; Brooklyn, New York, U.S.
- Died: July 28, 1937 (aged 63); Sitka, Alaska, U.S.
- Education: Amherst College; LMU Munich
- Scientific career
- Fields: Paleontology
- Workplaces: Amherst College
- Academic advisors: Karl Alfred von Zittel

Frederic Brewster Loomis (November 22, 1873 – July 28, 1937) was an American paleontologist. Educated at Amherst College and LMU Munich, he spent his entire professional career at Amherst. His specialty was vertebrate paleontology. Many fossils he uncovered during his extensive field work are still exhibited at Amherst's Beneski Museum of Natural History. He was a fellow of the American Academy of Arts and Sciences, a fellow of the Geological Society of America, and president of the Paleontological Society.

== Early life and education ==
Loomis was born November 22, 1873, in Brooklyn, New York, to Julie R. Loomis (née Brewster) and Nathaniel H. Loomis, a businessman who ran produce warehouses in New York City. In March 1877 his father died of rabies contracted from a dog bite. The family later moved to Rochester, New York, where he attended Rochester Free Academy and then Canandaigua Academy, which was then a private school for boys. Loomis's interest in paleontology dates from this period, when we spent his spare time collecting invertebrate fossils.

In 1892 Loomis entered Amherst College, where he joined Phi Delta Theta. After graduating in 1896 he remained at Amherst for a year as a research assistant in biology. In the fall of 1897 he entered LMU Munich to study under Karl Alfred von Zittel. He earned his Ph.D. from LMU in 1899.

== Career ==
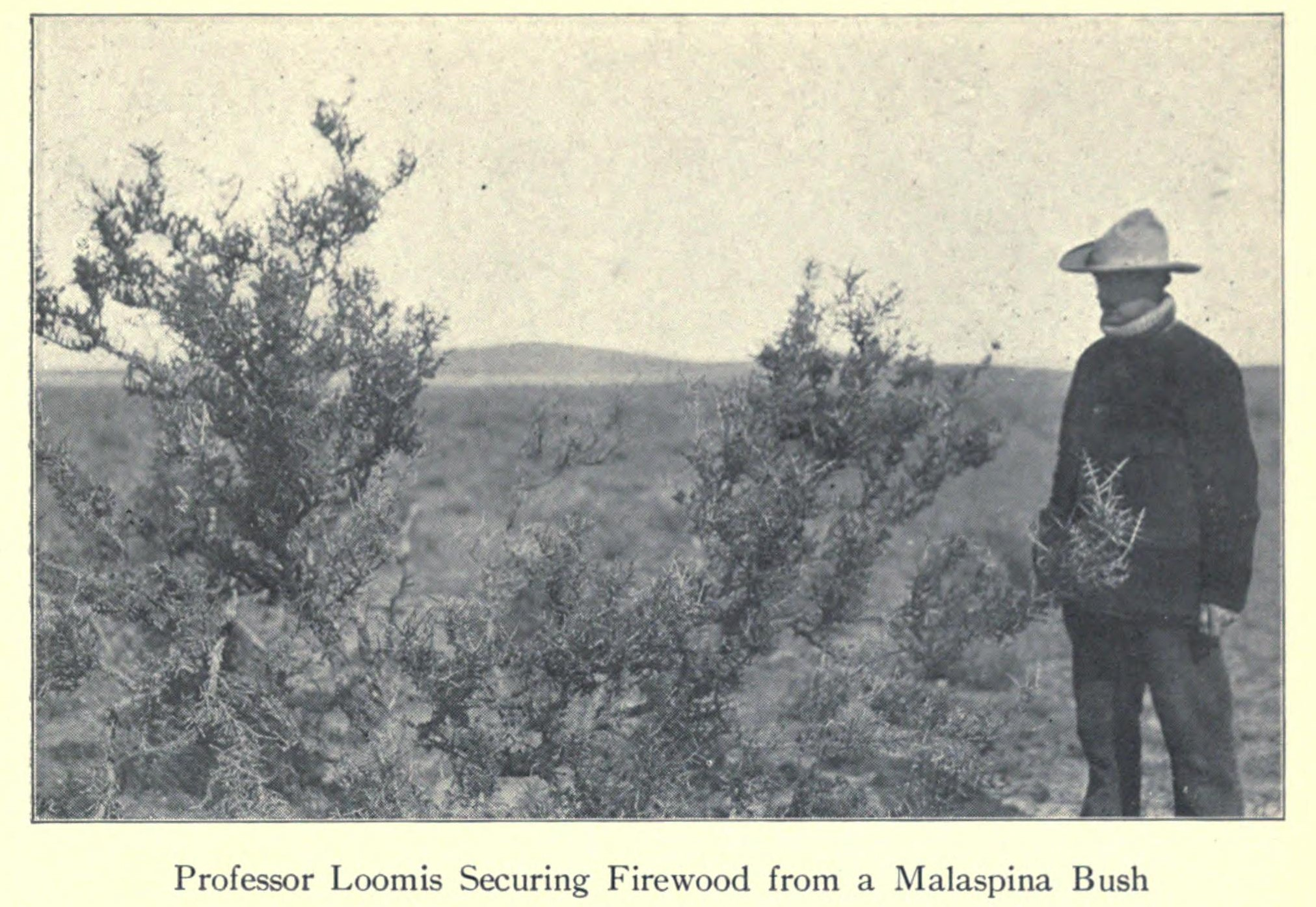
Professor Loomis with malaspina bush

After earning his Ph.D. Loomis returned to Amherst, where he remained on the faculty until his death. He was first an Instructor in the Department of Biology. He was named Associate Professor of Biology in 1903, Professor of Comparative Anatomy in 1908, and Professor of Geology in 1917. He also served as Vice President of the College and held this office at the time of his death.

Loomis was chiefly a vertebrate paleontologist, and most of his published research is in this area. He was highly active in field work. Most notably, a 1911 expedition to Patagonia funded by Loomis's Amherst Class of 1896 yielded several remarkable fossils of the extinct mammal Pyrotherium. He also explored areas of the Rocky Mountains, Florida and Maine, returning to Amherst with fossils of vertebrates including Eohippus, mastodons, and mammoths. These joined the collection of Amherst's natural history museum, known today as the Beneski Museum of Natural History. Loomis regarded the museum as his finest accomplishment, and his contributions were still exhibited there almost a century later.

He was elected a fellow of the Geological Society of America in 1909 and a fellow of the American Academy of Arts and Sciences in 1917. He was also active in the Paleontological Society, serving as its President in 1920.

The Springfield Science Museum in Springfield, Massachusetts, features an exhibit which includes a bone initially collected in New Mexico in 1924 during one of 17 expeditions led by Loomis. The exhibit includes photographs of Loomis on one of his expeditions.

== Death ==
On July 28, 1937, while fishing with his wife, Florence (Calhoun) Loomis, and sons off the coast of Sitka, Alaska, Loomis suffered a brain hemorrhage and died. He was buried a little more than a week later at Wildwood Cemetery in Amherst, Massachusetts.

== Bibliography ==
- (Gutenberg)
- (Gutenberg)
