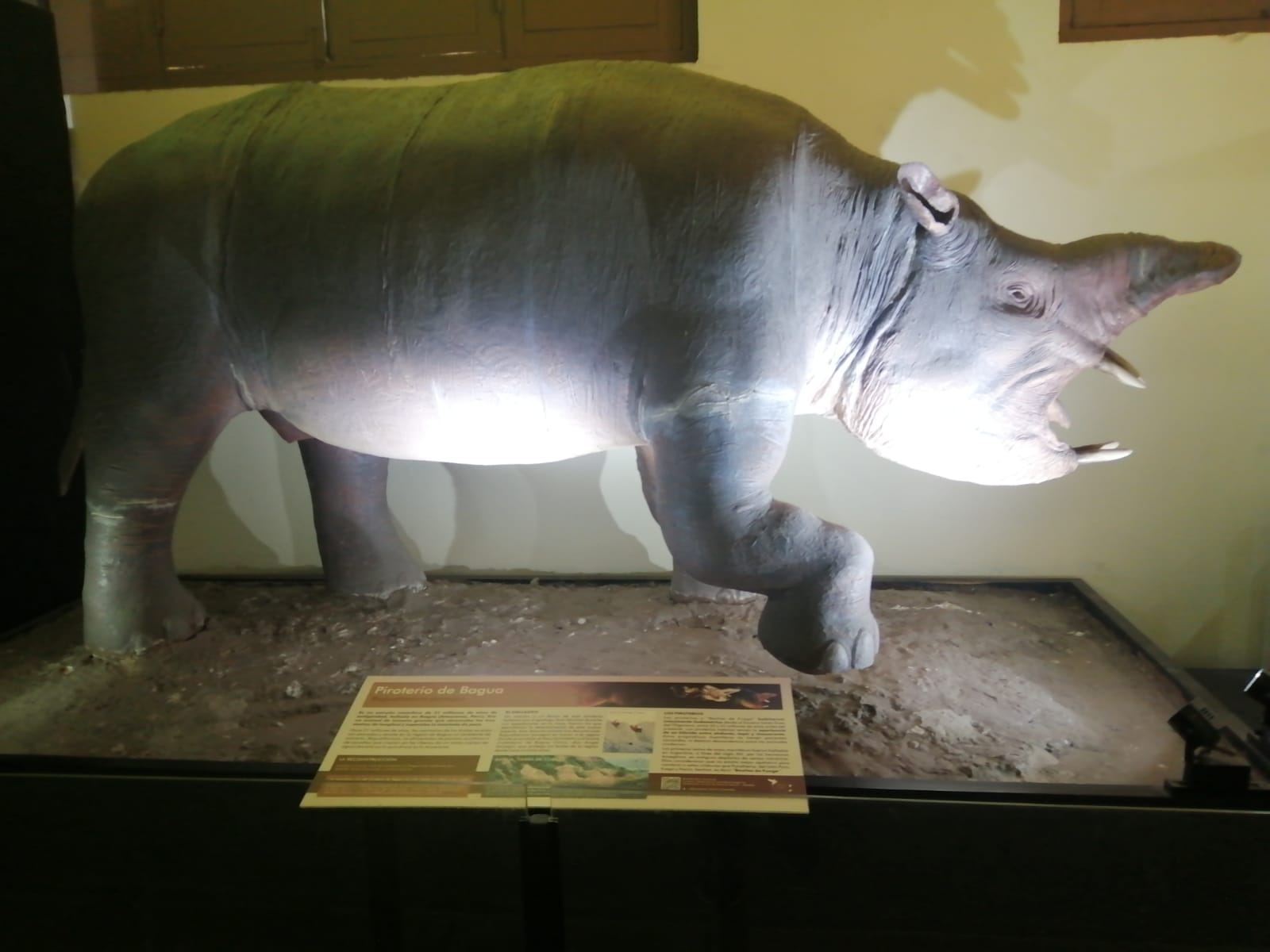

Scientific classification
- Kingdom: Animalia
- Phylum: Chordata
- Class: Mammalia
- Order: †Pyrotheria
- Family: †Pyrotheriidae
- Genus: †Baguatherium; Salas, Sánchez & Chacaltana 2006

Type species
- Baguatherium jaureguii Salas, Sánchez & Chacaltana, 2006

Species
- B. jaureguii Salas, Sánchez & Chacaltana 2006

= Baguatherium =

Baguatherium Temporal range: Early Oligocene ~31 Ma

Extinct genus of mammals

Baguatherium is an extinct genus of herbivorous mammal, belonging to the order Pyrotheria. It lived during the Early Oligocene, and its fossilized remains were discovered in Peru.

== Description ==
Although the fossils known are very partial (a maxilla, a left femur, isolated molars, they allow a comparison with those of similar animals better known, such as Pyrotherium, and it can be hypothesized that Baguatherium was a large animal with heavy forms, similar to early proboscideans or modern tapirs. Compared to Pyrotherium, Baguatherium possessed a slightly wider palate and the ridges on the molariform teeth were less oblique. A notable lingual crest connecting the posterior and anterior crests of those teeth was also present. The nasal bones, as in Pyrotherium, were set back and indicate the presence of a proboscis.

== Classification ==
Baguatherium jaureguii was first described in 2006, based on fossilized remains found near Bagua Grande, in the Department of Amazonas of Peru, in rocks belonging to the El Milagro Formation. The fossils indicates that it was a member of Pyrotheria, a clade of large sized mammals from the South American Eocene and Oligocene. In particular, the dental characteristics indicate that Baguatherium was a member of the Pyrotheriidae family, characterized by bilophodont teeth with high ridges.

== Paleobiology ==
A study on the dental wear of this animal and of other pyrotheres indicate that Baguatherium fed on tough materials, who were crushed thanks to the large molariform teeth. It is possible that the adaptations of its dentition were dictated by the expansion, during the Oligocene, of open environments, characterized by tougher plants.
