= Beneski Museum of Natural History =

Massachusetts museum

Beneski Museum of Natural History, Amherst College
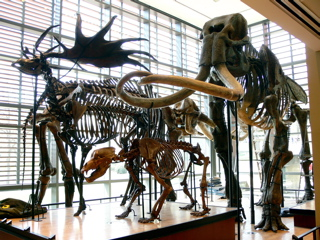
- Mammals of the Ice Age in the Main Hall
- Location: Amherst, Massachusetts
- Coordinates: 42.3721°N 72.5142°W
- Director: Alfred Venne
- Website: www.amherst.edu/museums/naturalhistory

The Beneski Museum of Natural History, Amherst College, is located on the campus of Amherst College in Amherst, Massachusetts. It showcases fossils and minerals collected locally and abroad, many by past and present students and professors. The museum is located in the Beneski Earth Sciences Building, completed in 2006. It is a member of Museums10.

== History ==
The Beneski Museum of Natural History's collection dates back to the earliest days of the college. Edward Hitchcock, who joined the faculty in 1825 and served as the third president of Amherst College from 1845 to 1854, was deeply interested in the sciences and encouraged alumni to send back scientific specimens from all over the world. During his presidency, Hitchcock raised funds for the building of the Octagon, the first home of Amherst's natural history collection. In 1855, the college built Appleton Cabinet with a donation from Samuel Appleton to house the Hitchcock Ichnological Cabinet, the Gilbert Museum of Indian Relics, and the Adams Zoological Museum.

The college's collections moved from various campus buildings to the former Pratt Gymnasium in the 1940s, creating the Pratt Museum of Natural History. The collection was moved to its current location in the Beneski Earth Sciences Building in 2006.

Today the museum houses roughly 200,000 objects, including the college's historic Hitchcock Ichnological Cabinet of more than 1,700 slabs containing dinosaur footprints, one of the largest in the world—and one largely collected by Hitchcock himself. The collection also includes the world-famous "Noah's Raven", tracks discovered in South Hadley, Massachusetts, in 1802 that constitute the first dinosaur fossil to be collected in North America—40 years before dinosaurs were even recognized as a distinct fossil group. Researchers from all over the world come to use the museum's collections in their work.

== Collections ==
The Beneski Museum of Natural History houses collections and exhibits that include vertebrate and invertebrate paleontology, minerals and other geologic specimens, and anthropological material. The museum contains three floors of exhibits and over 1,700 specimens on display. It is home to the world's largest collection of dinosaur tracks, the Hitchcock Ichnological Cabinet, which dates from the 1850s.

Specimens have been collected since the 1830s from local areas and around the world. Notable collectors include Edward Hitchcock, Charles Shepard, Amherst College Class of 1824, and Frederick Loomis, Amherst professor in the early 20th century.

The first floor showcases large Ice Age mammals, including a mastodon uncovered by Shepard in 1869 and a mammoth found by Loomis in 1923. This floor also has an exhibit on the evolution of the horse in North America. The second floor holds a variety of invertebrates, trace fossils, minerals, and exhibits on local geology. Mounted specimens and pull-out drawers on both these floors are arranged to chronicle evolution and ecology. The basement houses the ichnology collection along with dinosaur skeletons such as the most well preserved Dryosaurus specimen in the world and two legs of the massive Sauropod Dinosaur Dyslocosaurus. The museum also contains a jaw from "Alamotyrannus" which was discovered in 1924.

== Building ==
The Beneski Earth Sciences Building, which opened in 2006, houses both the geology program and the Beneski Museum of Natural History. Designed by Payette Associates, the 55,800-square-foot (5,180 m^{2}) building pays homage to the strong design features of surrounding buildings such as Fayerweather Hall. The building has won the most architectural awards of any Amherst College building, receiving the 2007 American Institute of Architects New England Chapter Honor Award for Design Excellence, and the 2008 Best in Class Brick in Architecture Award in the Educational Building category.

The overall building design was driven by the tenets of integrated learning and the belief that students learn science best by actively participating in the research process. Many conventional classrooms were replaced with teaching laboratories that combine different research functions within single research labs, as well as provide easy access to the vast collections of the museum of natural history.

The building's southern exposure faces the Holyoke Range and its instructive geoformations; landscaping incorporates 35 tons of rocks brought in from the Adirondack Mountains; and the bathroom countertops vary by floor, made of igneous rocks on one level, metamorphic rocks on another, and sedimentary rocks on yet a third.

== See also ==
- List of Museums in the United States
