= Edward Hitchcock =

American paleontologist

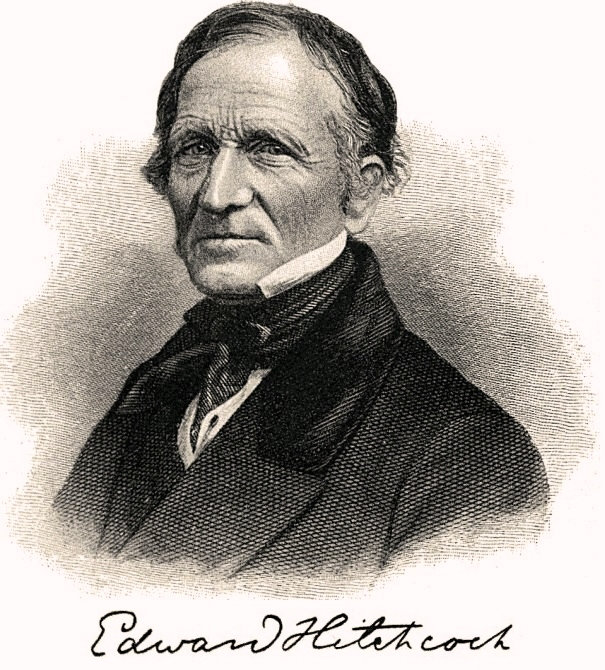
- Born: May 24, 1793; Deerfield, Massachusetts
- Died: February 27, 1864 (aged 70); Amherst, Massachusetts
- Citizenship: United States
- Education: Deerfield Academy
- Spouse: Orra White Hitchcock
- Scientific career
- Fields: Geology; Natural history
- Author abbrev. (botany): E.Hitchc.

Edward Hitchcock (May 24, 1793 – February 27, 1864) was an American geologist and the third President of Amherst College (1845–1854).

== Life ==
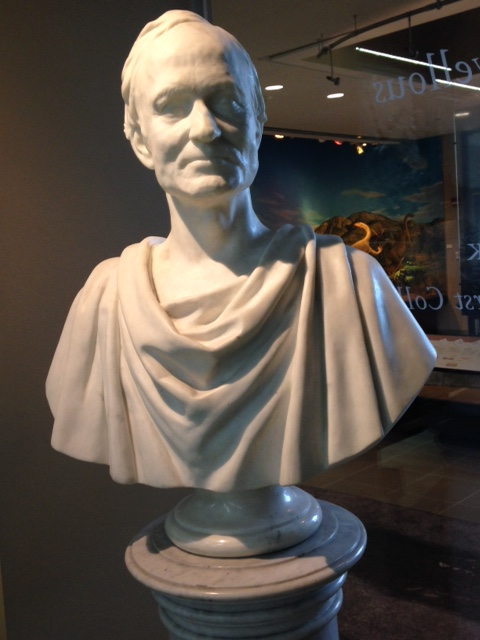
A bust of Hitchcock at Amherst College.

Born to poor parents, he attended newly founded Deerfield Academy, where he was later principal, from 1815 to 1818. In 1821 he was ordained as a Congregationalist pastor and served as pastor of the Congregational Church in Conway, Massachusetts, 1821–1825. He left the ministry to become Professor of Chemistry and Natural History at Amherst College. He held that post from 1825 to 1845, serving as Professor of Natural Theology and Geology from 1845 until his death in 1864. In 1845, Hitchcock became President of the College, a post he held until 1854. As president, Hitchcock was responsible for Amherst's recovery from severe financial difficulties. He is also credited with developing the college's scientific resources and establishing its reputation for scientific teaching.

In addition to his positions at Amherst, Hitchcock was a well-known early geologist. He ran the first geological survey of Massachusetts, and in 1830 was appointed state geologist of Massachusetts (he held the post until 1844). He also played a role in the geological surveys of New York and Vermont. His chief project, however, was natural theology, which attempted to unify and reconcile science and religion, focusing on geology. His major work in this area was The Religion of Geology and Its Connected Sciences (1851). In this book, he sought out ways to re-interpret the Bible to agree with the latest geological theories. For example, knowing that the earth was at least hundreds of thousands of years old, vastly older than the 6,000 years allowed by certain biblical interpretations, Hitchcock devised a way to read the original Hebrew so that a single letter in Genesis—a "v", meaning "afterwards"—implied the vast timespans during which the earth was formed. Randy Moore described Hitchcock as "America's leading advocate of catastrophism-based gap creationism."

Hitchcock left his mark in paleontology. He discovered some of the first fossil fishes in the United States. He published papers on fossilized tracks in the Connecticut Valley, including Eubrontes and Otozoum, that were later associated with dinosaurs, though he believed, with a certain prescience, that they were made by gigantic ancient birds. In the Hitchcock Ichnological Cabinet he established a remarkable collection of fossil footmarks. His son, Edward "Doc" Hitchcock Jr., named one of the earliest dinosaurs discovered in North America and the United States, Megadactylus polyzelus. Later it was reclassified as the type specimen of Anchisaurus polyzelus (ACM 41109), a prosauropod. This botanist is denoted by the author abbreviation E.Hitchc. when citing a botanical name.

As he had researched the geologic lake which once filled the Connecticut River basin, this prehistoric lake was named after him. Since he had done geological research on the Holyoke Range, one of the mountains there, Mount Hitchcock, was named after him.

He was elected a Fellow of the American Academy of Arts and Sciences in 1834. From 1856 to 1861, Hitchcock was the State Geologist for Vermont.

In 1841, he was elected as a member to the American Philosophical Society.

His collections, a bust and portrait can be viewed at the Amherst College Museum of Natural History. The Archives and Special Collections at Amherst holds his papers.

In 1821, he married Orra White, one of the earliest women botanical and scientific illustrators in the U.S. The two worked closely together, and she contributed more than 1,000 illustrations to his many scientific publications.

== Paleontological chart ==
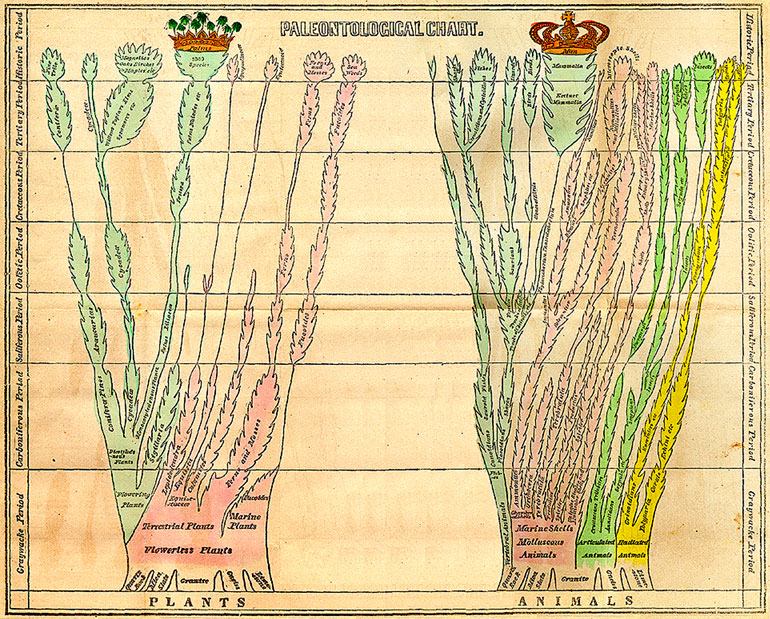
Fold-out paleontological chart of Edward Hitchcock in Elementary Geology (1840)

He inserted a paleontological chart in his Elementary Geology (1840). It shows a branching diagram of the plant and animal kingdom against a geological background. He referred to it as a tree. This "tree of life" is the earliest known version that incorporates paleontological and geological information.

Hitchcock was an advocate of gap creationism. Hitchcock saw God as the agent of change. He explicitly rejected evolution and a religious six-day creation. He believed that new species were introduced by a deity at the right time in the history of the earth. The chart is present in all editions between 1840 and 1859. After Charles Darwin (1859) published his On the Origin of Species, a tree of life image was generally interpreted as an evolutionary tree. In the 1860 edition of Elementary Geology Hitchcock dropped the chart. In 1863 Hitchcock wrote an article in which he criticized Darwin’s theory of natural selection. After his death in 1864, his son Charles Henry Hitchcock (1836–1919) published a new edition (1870) also without a paleontological chart. Charles then published books and articles of his own.

== Writings ==
- Geology of the Connecticut Valley (1823)
- "Retrospection: A Sermon Delivered at Amherst, MA, at Close of Spring Term". May 13, 1823. Northampton, MA: Sylvester Judd, Jr., 1823.
- Catalogue of the Plants within Twenty Miles of Amherst (1829)
- An Essay on Temperance, Addressed Particularly to Students, and the Young Men of America(1830)
- Elementary Geology, 1840. (31 editions)
- The Religion of Geology and its Connected Sciences (1851)
- Dyspepsy Forestalled and Resisted, Or, Lectures on Diet, Regimen, and Employment
- Lectures on the Peculiar Phenomena of the Four Seasons (1850)
- Reports on the Geology of Massachusetts (1833, 1835, 1838, 1841)
- Outline of the Geology of the Globe and of the United States in Particular with Sketches of Characteristic American Fossils (1853)
- Illustrations of Surface Geology (1857)
- Reminiscences of Amherst College (1863)

== See also ==
- Amherst College Museum of Natural History
- Daniel Davis Jr. - electrical device inventor
- Connecticut River Valley trackways
- Tree of Life

Academic offices
Preceded by Heman Humphrey	President of Amherst College; 1845–1854	Succeeded by William Augustus Stearns
