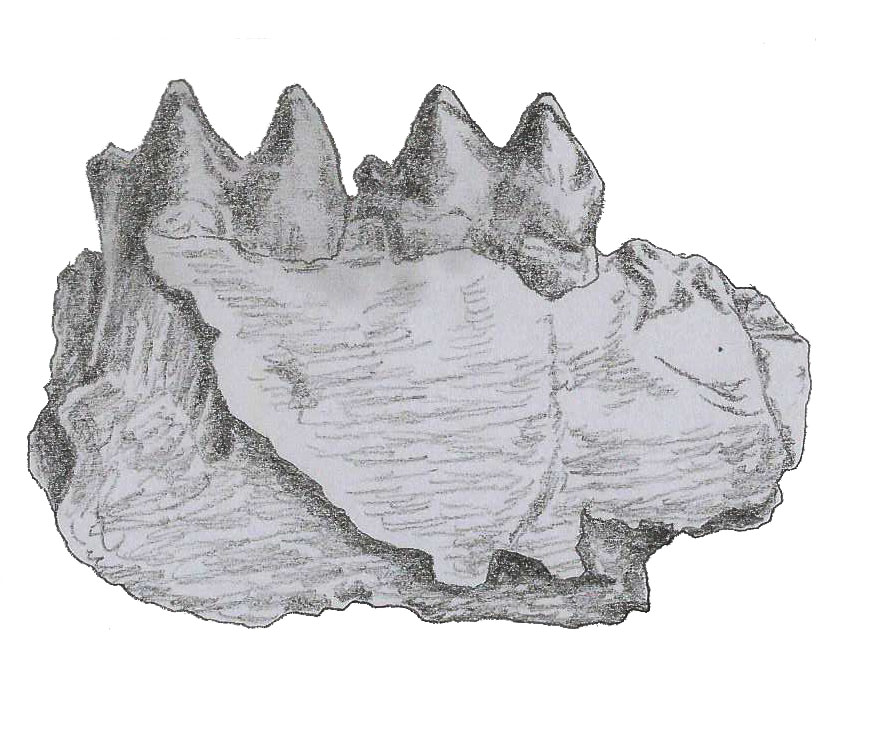
- Mandible of Griphodon

Scientific classification
- Kingdom: Animalia
- Phylum: Chordata
- Class: Mammalia
- Order: †Pyrotheria
- Family: †Pyrotheriidae
- Genus: †Griphodon; Anthony 1924

Type species
- Griphodon peruvianus Anthony, 1924

Species
- G. peruvianus Anthony 1924

= Griphodon =

Griphodon Temporal range: Middle Eocene ~48–37 Ma

Extinct genus of mammals

Griphodon is an extinct genus of mammals, belonging to the order Pyrotheria. It lived during the Middle Eocene, in what is now Peru.

== Description ==
All that is known about this animal is a fragment of a mandible complete with teeth. Its teeth were two-crested, slightly more transversal than in other genera such as Carolozittelia, but there are indications of the presence of a longitudinal crest, and even, in the third premolar, of a complete crest, not found in Pyrotherium.

== Classification ==
Griphodon peruvianus was first described in 1924 by Anthony, who considered it to be a Perissodactyl. The fragmentary fossil was found near Chicoca, along the Huallaga River by J. G. Richards. Subsequently the genus was considered a basal member of the Pyrotheres, a mysterious clade of heavy-shaped mammals from the Early Cenozoic of South America, of uncertain affinities. Other fossils attributed to Griphodon were later found near Contamana in the Loreto Province of Peru.

== Paleoecology ==
Griphodon seems to have had a diet mainly composed of tough plants, which were crushed by its powerful crested teeth.
