= Hitchcock Ichnological Cabinet =

Fossil footmark collection in Massachusetts, US

Coordinates: 42°22′19.07″N 72°30′51.26″W

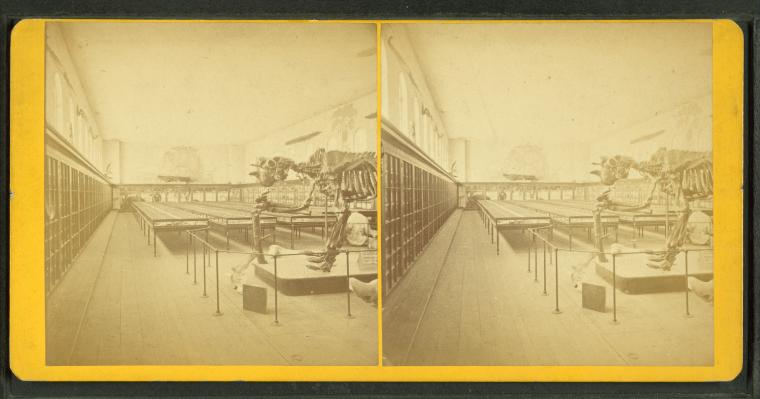
Hitchcock Ichnological Cabinet

The Hitchcock Ichnological Cabinet is a collection of fossil footprints assembled between 1836 and 1865 by Edward Hitchcock (1793–1864), noted American geologist, state geologist of Massachusetts, United States, and President of Amherst College. He was one of the first experts in fossil tracks.

== History ==
Begun when the science of ichnology (the study of tracks) was in its infancy, and the word dinosaur had not been coined yet, the collection was made chiefly from the fossils of the Connecticut River Valley (Connecticut River Valley trackways). By 1875 this collection consisted of 21,773 tracks representing 120 species. It is the world's largest collection of dinosaur tracks.

Starting in 1855, the collection was located in the lower level of Appleton Cabinet on the Amherst College campus. It has subsequently been twice relocated, and can now be found in the Amherst College Museum of Natural History.

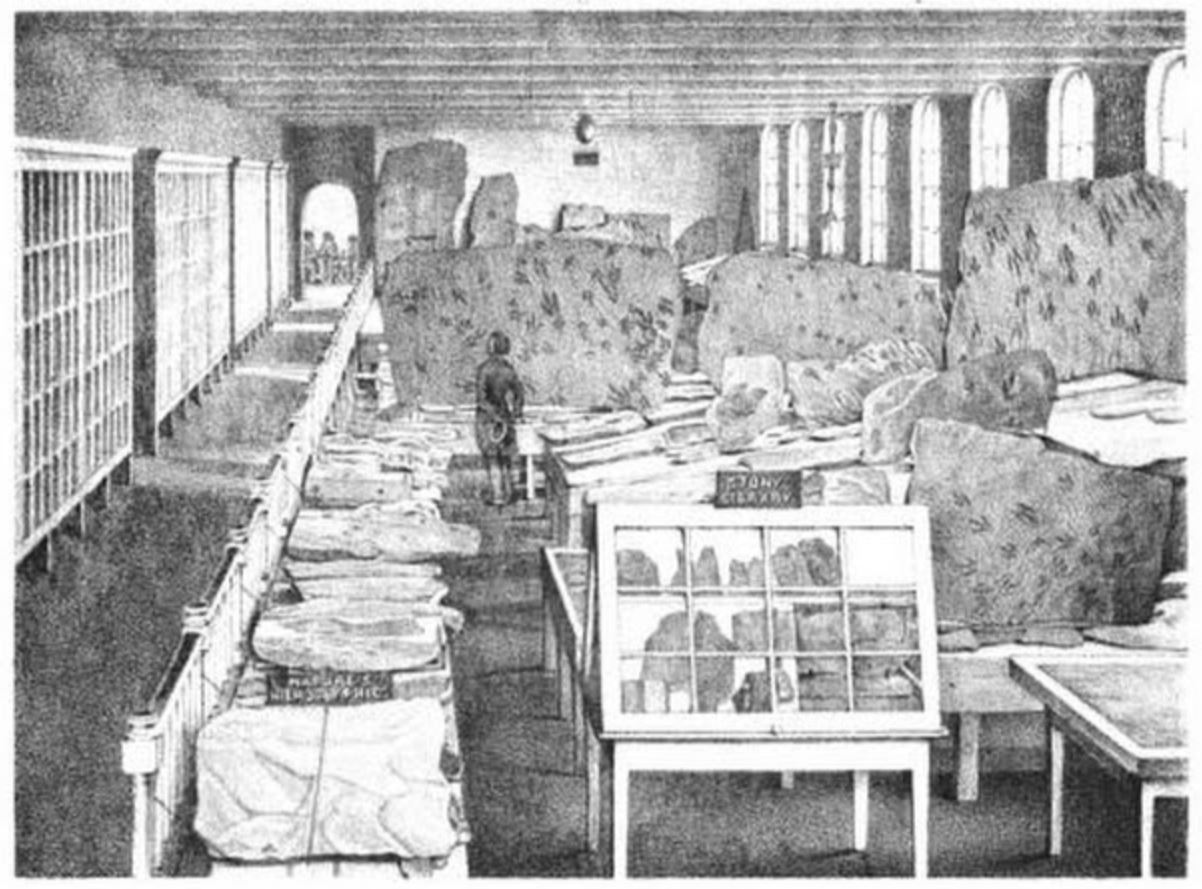
Plate 4 Figure 1 from Hitchcock's Ichnology of New England (1858)

== See also ==
- Dinosaur State Park
