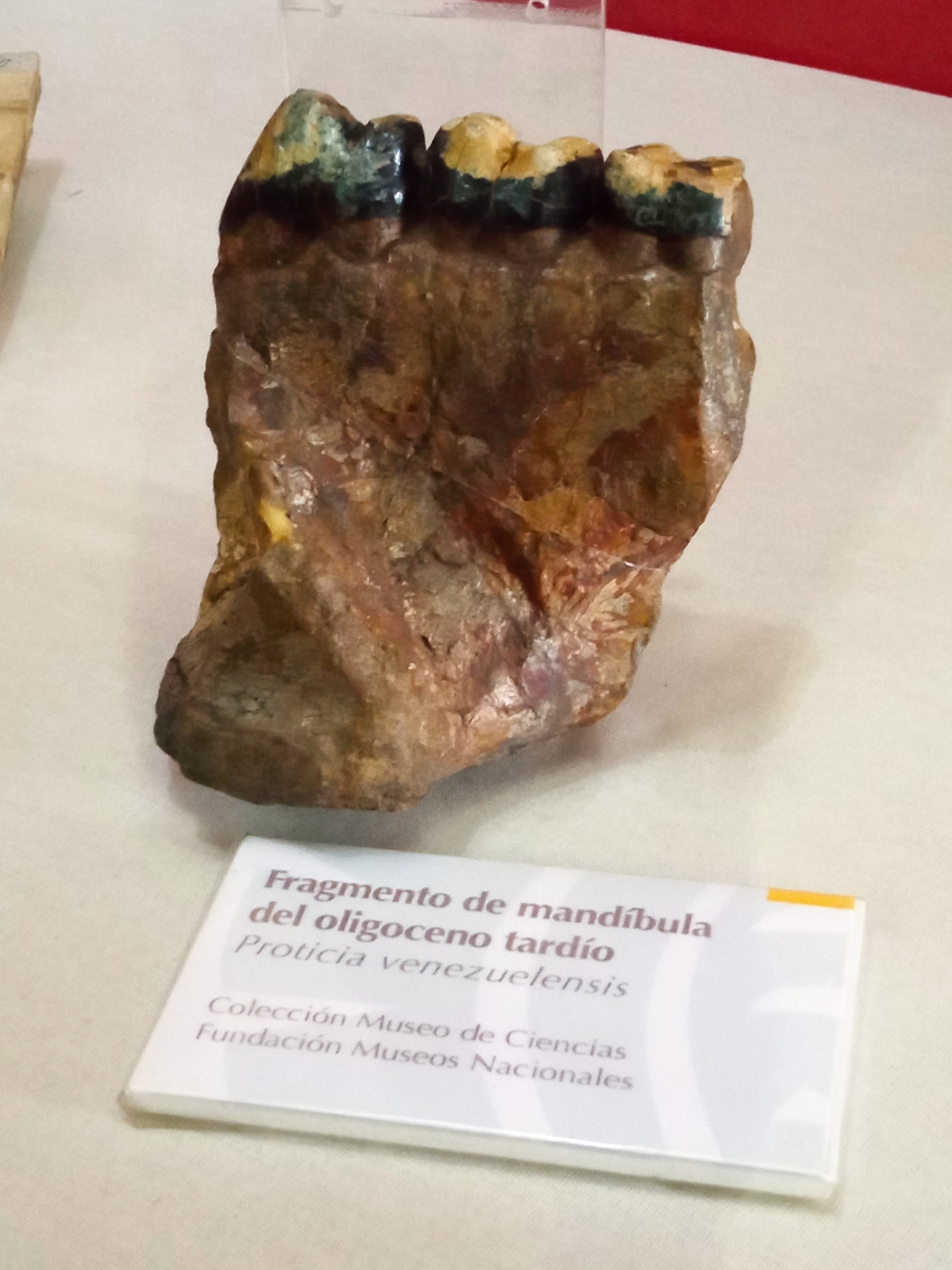

Scientific classification
- Kingdom: Animalia
- Phylum: Chordata
- Class: Mammalia
- Order: †Pyrotheria
- Family: †Colombitheriidae
- Genus: †Proticia; Patterson 1977

Type species
- Proticia venezuelensis Patterson, 1977

Species
- P. venezuelensis Patterson 1977

= Proticia =

Proticia Temporal range: Eocene ~52–50 Ma

Extinct genus of mammals

Proticia is an extinct genus of mammals belonging to the order Pyrotheria. It lived during the Early Eocene, and its fossilized remains were discovered in South America.

== Description ==
This animal is only known from a fragmentary mandible preserving several teeth, and it is therefore impossible to reconstruct its exact appearance.

Proticia's teeth had a bunodont structure, and their characteristic were similar to its enigmatic relative Colombitherium; the molars and premolars, however, possessed more bulbous cusps and the lophids had disappeared.

== Classification ==
Proticia venezuelensis was first described in 1977 by Bryan Patterson, based on an incomplete mandible preserving the third premolar and the first molar. It is likely that Proticia was similar to Colombitherium, another enigmatic large mammal from the South American Eocene, probably more recent. Patterson found the remains of Proticia in the Lara State of Venezuela, in soils probably belonging to the upper part of the Trujillo Formation (Lower Eocene). It is unclear, however, whether the fossils of Proticia also date back to the Early Eocene.

== Bibliography ==
- B. Patterson. 1977. A primitive pyrothere (Mammalia, Notoungulata) from the early Tertiary of Northwestern Venezuela. Fieldiana Geology 33(22):397-422
- Billet, G., Orliac, M., Antoine, P.-O., Jaramillo, C. A. 2010. New observations and reinterpretation on the enigmatic taxon Colombitherium (?Pyrotheria, Mammalia) from Colombia. Palaeontology, 53(2): 319-325.
