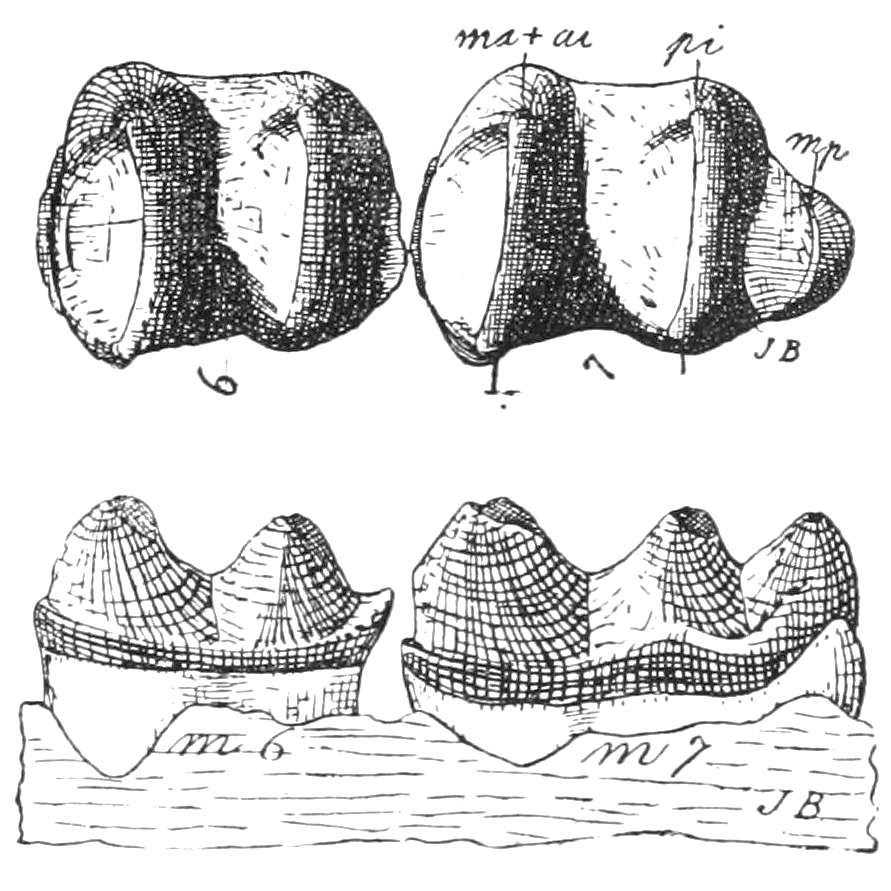

Scientific classification
- Domain: Eukaryota
- Kingdom: Animalia
- Phylum: Chordata
- Class: Mammalia
- Order: †Pyrotheria
- Family: †Pyrotheriidae
- Genus: †Carolozittelia; Ameghino 1901
- Species: †C. tapiroides

Binomial name
- †Carolozittelia tapiroides Ameghino, 1901

Synonyms
- C. eluta Ameghino 1901

= Carolozittelia =

Carolozittelia Temporal range: Early Eocene (Ypresian-Bartonian) ~48–45 Ma

Extinct genus of mammals

Carolozittelia is an extinct genus of mammals, belonging to the order Pyrotheria. It contains the single species Carolozittelia tapiroides which lived during the Early Eocene. Its fossilized remains were found in South America.

== Description ==
This genus is only known from a few fossil teeth, and its appearance is entirely conjectural. The molars of Carolozittelia were endowed with transversal crests, but traces of tubercles from a primitive quadrituberculate dentition can still be recognized.

== Classification ==
Carolozittelia was first described in 1901 by Florentino Ameghino, based on fossils found in Argentinian Patagonia, in terrains dating from the Eocene. Ameghino described two species attributed to the genus: Carolozittelia tapiroides and C. eluta, the second later synonymized with the first.

Carolozittelia was a Pyrothere, a clade of South American mammals of uncertain affinities, who lived during the early Cenozoic. It was one of the oldest members of the order, and is now considered one of the most basal members of the family Pyrotheriidae.

== Bibliography ==
- F. Ameghino. 1901. Notices préliminaires sur des ongulés nouveaux des terrains crétacés de Patagonie [Preliminary notes on new ungulates from the Cretaceous terrains of Patagonia]. Boletin de la Academia Nacional de Ciencias de Córdoba 16:349-429
- G. G. Simpson. 1967. The beginning of the age of mammals in South America. Part II. Bulletin of the American Museum of Natural History 137:1-260
