= Lakukullus =

Lakukullus Temporal range: Middle Miocene (Laventan) ~13.8–11.8 Ma

Scientific classification
- Kingdom: Animalia
- Phylum: Chordata
- Class: Mammalia
- Infraclass: Placentalia
- Order: Pilosa
- Suborder: Folivora
- Family: †Nothrotheriidae
- Subfamily: †Nothrotheriinae
- Genus: †Lakukullus; Pujos et al., 2014
- Species: †L. anatisrostratus

Binomial name
- †Lakukullus anatisrostratus Pujos et al., 2014

Extinct genus of ground sloths

Lakukullus is an extinct genus of nothrotheriid ground sloths that lived during the Middle Miocene around 13.8 to 11.8 million years ago of what is now Bolivia.

== Etymology ==
The genus name, Lakukullus, is composed of "Laku’kullu", which means "wild animal of heights" in Aymara, a native Bolivian language, which refers to the locality the specimen was found. The specific name is derived from the Latin word "anatisrostratum", which means "duck beak" in reference to the aspect of the snout appearing physically similar to the bill of an aquatic bird.

== Classification ==
Lakukullus is a genus from the now extinct family of Nothrotheriidae. The Nothrotheriidae are represented by rather medium-sized members of the suborder of sloths, Folivora. Their phylogenetically younger members possessed a dentition reduced by the anterior-most tooth per mandibular arch, diverging from other sloth groups. The Nothrotheriidae, together with the Megatheriidae and with the Megalonychidae, form a more closely related group within the sloths, the superfamily of Megatherioidea. According to the classical view, determined by skeletal anatomy investigations, the Megatherioidea can be considered one of the two major sloth lineages, the second being represented by the Mylodontoidea. With the inclusion of molecular genetic and protein-based studies, a third lineage, the Megalocnoidea, is added. According to the latter studies, the Megatherioidea also include one of the two present-day sloth genera, the three-toed sloths of the genus Bradypus. Thereby, within the Megatherioidea, the Megatheriidae and the Nothrotheriidae are in a sister group relationship, but in part a closer relationship of the Nothrotheriidae with the Megalonychidae is also discussed. Overall, the Nothrotheriidae comprise only about a dozen genera, with their earliest record dating to the Middle Miocene. Two subfamilies can be distinguished within the family. Thalassocnus is generally assigned to Thalassocninae as its sole member. The other subfamily is represented by the Nothrotheriinae, which includes, among others, the better known forms of the Pleistocene such as Nothrotherium from South America and Nothrotheriops from North America. In addition, Lakukullus is also one of the most basal known members of the subfamily Nothrotheriinae.

Below is a phylogenetic tree of the Nothrotheriinae based on Varela et al. 2019.

- Nothrotheriidae
  - Thalassocninae
    - Thalassocnus
  - Nothrotheriinae
    - Lakukullus
    - - - Mionothropus
        - - Nothrotherium
          - Nothrotheriops
      - - Pronothrotherium
        - - Aymaratherium
          - Xyophorus
