= Aymaratherium =

Aymaratherium Temporal range: Late Miocene-Early Pliocene (Huayquerian-Montehermosan) ~6.8–3.0 Ma

Scientific classification
- Kingdom: Animalia
- Phylum: Chordata
- Class: Mammalia
- Order: Pilosa
- Family: †Nothrotheriidae
- Subfamily: †Nothrotheriinae
- Genus: †Aymaratherium; Pujos et al., 2016
- Species: †A. jeani

Binomial name
- †Aymaratherium jeani Pujos et al., 2016

Extinct genus of ground sloths

Aymaratherium is an extinct genus of nothrotheriid ground sloths that lived during the Late Miocene and Early Pliocene of Bolivia. Fossils of Aymaratherium have been found in the Pomata Ayte locality of the Umala Formation.

== Etymology ==
The genus name, Aymaratherium, is derived from the Aymara, a native ethnic group and language from the Andes, and therion, meaning "beast". The specific name honors Jean Joinville Vacher, for his friendship and constant support for palaeontological investigations over the years.

== Discovery ==
Aymaratherium was first described in 2016 on the basis of a nearly complete right dentary (specimen MNHN-Bol-V 008954), which was made of the holotype. In addition, three complete humeri (MNHN-Bol-V 003789, 012874 and 012875), a right astragalus (MNHN-Bol-V 012983), and a complete right calcaneus (MNHN-Bol-V 003307) have also been assigned to the genus. The locality of the holotype was recovered from the Pomata-Ayte locality, in the Umala Formation, which is considered to be Early Pliocene in age, and is situated at the Oruro Department in Carangas Province near the city of the same name. Other vertebrate fauna found at the locality include the macraucheniid litoptern Macrauchenia sp., the toxodontid notoungulate Posnanskytherium, several xenarthrans such as the sloths Simomylodon uccasamamensis Megatherium altiplanicum, and the pampatheriid cingulate Plaina.

== Description ==
Aymaratherium is a small to medium-sized nothrotheriid that was of similar size to Nothrotherium and Thalassocnus. According to Pujos et al. (2016), Aymaratherium was diagnosed under the autapomorphies; the presence of lower dentition consisting of a single small caniniform and three large molariform teeth, the absence of a diastema between c1 and m1, a very high hypsodonty index, which is also seen in Megatherium and Megalonyx, and a deep buccinator fossa and extremely thin dorsal margin of the spout. The molariform teeth of the type are mesially convex and the most mesial tooth closely approaches the dorsolateral margin of the mandible meaning that the individual was an adult or subadult at the time of its death.

== Classification ==
The 2016 study that described Aymaratherium recovers it as a derived nothrotheriid, within the subfamily Nothrotheriinae, as the sister taxon to the tribe Nothrotheriini. Below is a parsimony tree establishing the relationships between the genera of the Nothrotheriidae, as proposed by Pujos et al, 2016.

- Megatherioidea
  - Hapalops
  - Nothrotheriidae
    - Thalassocnus
    - Nothrotheriinae
      - Mionothropus
      - - Pronothrotherium
        - - Aymaratherium
          - Nothrotheriini
            - Nothrotheriops
            - Nothrotherium
