= Mionothropus =

Mionothropus Temporal range: Late Miocene (Huayquerian) ~7.9 Ma

Scientific classification
- Domain: Eukaryota
- Kingdom: Animalia
- Phylum: Chordata
- Class: Mammalia
- Order: Pilosa
- Family: †Nothrotheriidae
- Subfamily: †Nothrotheriinae
- Genus: †Mionothropus; De Iuliis et al. 2011

Species
- M. cartellei De Iuliis et al. 2011 (type)

Extinct genus of mammals

Mionothropus is an extinct genus of nothrotheriine nothrotheriid sloth which existed in Peru in the western Amazon Basin, during the late Miocene (Huayquerian age). It is known from the holotype LACM 4609/117533, which includes cranial remains, recovered from the riverbank deposits of the Iñapari Formation in the Río Acre region, were originally assigned to Nothropus priscus. It was first named by Gerardo De Iuliis, Timothy J. Gaudin and Matthew J. Vicars in 2011 and the type species is Mionothropus cartellei. The generic name is derived from "Mio", is a reference to the Miocene provenance of the holotype, and "nothropus" refers to the initial allocation of the holotype to this genus from the South American Pleistocene. The specific name honours Dr. Castor Cartelle.

== Phylogeny ==
Cladogram after De Iuliis, Gaudin & Vicars, 2011:

- Nothrotheriidae
  - Thalassocnus
  - Nothrotheriinae
    - Mionothropus
    - - Pronothrotherium
      - Nothrotheriini
        - Nothrotheriops
        - Nothrotherium
