= Chasicobradys =

Chasicobradys Temporal range: Late Miocene (Chasicoan) ~10–9 Ma

Scientific classification
- Domain: Eukaryota
- Kingdom: Animalia
- Phylum: Chordata
- Class: Mammalia
- Order: Pilosa
- Family: †Nothrotheriidae
- Subfamily: †Nothrotheriinae
- Genus: †Chasicobradys; Scillato-Yané et al. 1987
- Species: †C. intermedius

Binomial name
- †Chasicobradys intermedius Scillato-Yané et al. 1987

Extinct genus of ground sloths

Chasicobradys is an extinct genus of ground sloths of the family Nothrotheriidae that lived in what is now Argentina. Chasicobradys was discovered in the Arroyo Chasicó Formation, in Buenos Aires Province. It is only known from jaw fragments and teeth, which allowed the identification of this species, and was classified as a member of the nothrotheriid subfamily Nothrotheriinae, which comprises small to medium-sized species of ground sloths.

== Etymology ==
The genus name, Chasicobradys, is derived from the Arroyo Chasicó Formation in Argentina and bradys meaning "slow". was found. The specific name means "intermediate".

== Description ==
Chasicobradys is a medium-sized species, similar in size to the Argentine species Neohapalops rothi, characterized by a very high mandibular ramus and characteristics of its molariform teeth, such as the lack of a diastema between the first and second molars and the oblique location of the fourth molars.

Chasicobradys is one of the few sloths present in the Arroyo Chasicó Formation. Additional remains found in the area suggest the presence of other nothrotheriines along with a genus of megatheriid sloth, Anisodontherium. The remains of these sloths show that at this time the nothrotheriids were already differentiated from the megatheriids and possessed the characteristics that would identify them in later times.

== Palaeoecology ==
The Arroyo Chasicó formation was, in the Miocene, on the tip of a peninsula bordered by the Paranaense Sea. Chasicobradys would have lived alongside various genera of Cingulata, including the last horned armadillo Epipeltephilus, the Dasypodidae Vetelia and Chasicotatus, the Euphractinae Proeuphractus, the Glyptodontinae Kelenkura and the pampathere Kraglievichia. Other xenarthrans includes several genera of ground sloths, such as the Mylodontidae Octomylodon, the Megalonychidae Protomegalonyx, the fellow Nothrotheriidae Xyophorus, and the Megatheriidae Anisodontherium. Several genera of rodents were recovered from the formation, such as the earliest genus of tuco-tucos, maras and capybaras such as Cardiomys, Procardiomys and Cardiatherium, Octodontidae such as Chasicomys and Chasichimys, the Echimyidae Pattersomys, the plain viscacha Lagostomus telenkechanum and its relative Prolagostomus, and large-sized Dinomyidae like Carlesia. Meridiungulates were also present in the formation, with Litopterna genera such as the Macraucheniidae Cullinia and Paranauchenia and the Proterotheriidae Neobrachytherium, while notoungulates were represented by genera such as the large-sized late surviving Homalodotheriidae Chasicotherium, the Toxodontidae Paratrigodon, the Interatheriidae Protypotherium, the Mesotheriidae Typotheriopsis, and the Hegetotheriidae Paedotherium, Pseudohegetotherium and Hemihegetotherium. The largest predators were the Sparassodonta Pseudolycopsis cabrerai and Lycopsis viverensis, and the small terror bird Psilopterus.
