= Nothropus =

Nothropus Temporal range: Mid-Late Pleistocene (Ensenadan) ~0.78–0.012 Ma

Scientific classification
- Kingdom: Animalia
- Phylum: Chordata
- Class: Mammalia
- Order: Pilosa
- Family: †Nothrotheriidae
- Subfamily: †Nothrotheriinae
- Genus: †Nothropus; Burmeister (1882)

Type species
- †Nothropus priscus Burmeister, 1882

Species
- N. carcaranensis Bordas, 1942

Synonyms
- Coleodon tarijensis Burmeister, 1887

Extinct genus of ground sloths

Nothropus is an extinct genus of ground sloth of the family Nothrotheriidae, endemic to South America during the Pleistocene epoch. It lived from 0.781 mya—12,000 years ago existing for approximately 0.769 million years. It was believed to be a ground-dwelling herbivore.

== Taxonomy ==
Nothropus priscus and Nothropus nordenskioldi are described as subtaxa. Nothropus was named by Hermann Burmeister (1882). It was assigned to Megalonychidae by L. G. Marshall and T. Sempere (1991) and to Nothrotheriidae by Christian de Muizon et al. (2004).

== Fossil distribution ==
Fossils have been uncovered from the Tarija Formation, Tarija Department, Bolivia, east side of the Andes Mountains.
