= Mcdonaldocnus =

Mcdonaldocnus Temporal range: Middle Miocene-Early Pliocene (Friasian-Montehermosan) ~16.3–5.3 Ma

Scientific classification
- Domain: Eukaryota
- Kingdom: Animalia
- Phylum: Chordata
- Class: Mammalia
- Order: Pilosa
- Family: †Nothrotheriidae
- Subfamily: †Nothrotheriinae
- Genus: †Mcdonaldocnus; Gaudin et al. 2022

Type species
- †Mcdonaldocnus bondesioi (Scillato-Yané 1979)

Synonyms
- Xyophorus bondesioi Scillato-Yané 1979

Extinct genus of ground sloths

Mcdonaldocnus is an extinct genus of nothrotheriid ground sloths that lived during the Middle Miocene and Early Pliocene of what is now Bolivia and Argentina. It was originally placed in the genus Xyophorus but was subsequently recognized as a distinct genus by Gaudin and colleagues in 2022. The authors reassigned the material of "Xyophorus" bondesioi, Xyophorus villarroeli and Xyophorus sp. to Mcdonaldocnus. Fossils of Mcdonaldocnus have been found in the Cerro Azul Formation of Argentina.

== Etymology ==
The genus name, Mcdonaldocnus, is composed of the prefix Mcdonald-, which honors the retired U.S. Bureau of Land Management scientist Dr. H. Gregory McDonald, a notable sloth specialist, and the greek suffix -ocnus, meaning "hesitating or inactive", which is commonly used to name extinct sloths. The species name, Mcdonaldocnus bondesioi, honors the paleontologist Pedro Bondesio
