= Hadrokirus =

Hadrokirus Temporal range: Late Miocene ~6 Ma

Scientific classification
- Kingdom: Animalia
- Phylum: Chordata
- Class: Mammalia
- Order: Carnivora
- Parvorder: Pinnipedia
- Family: Phocidae
- Subfamily: Monachinae
- Genus: †Hadrokirus

Type species
- †Hadrokirus martini Amson & De Muizon 2013

Other species
- †H. novotini Hafed et al., 2022

Extinct genus of carnivores

Hadrokirus is an extinct genus of true seal (Phocidae) that lived on the coast of Peru and North Carolina about 6 million years ago. The type species, H. martini, was found in the Pisco Formation, together with other marine animals such as crustaceans, sharks, coastal birds, whales and aquatic sloths. The distinguishing feature of the seal was its teeth: they were extremely robust, hence the name (hadros, "stout" in Greek; kiru, tooth in Quechua). It is assumed that Hadrokirus martini was durophagous; its diet probably comprised crustaceans, small bivalves and other shelled animals, similar to that of the living sea otter. The living seals most closely related to Hadrokirus are the Antarctic seals.
