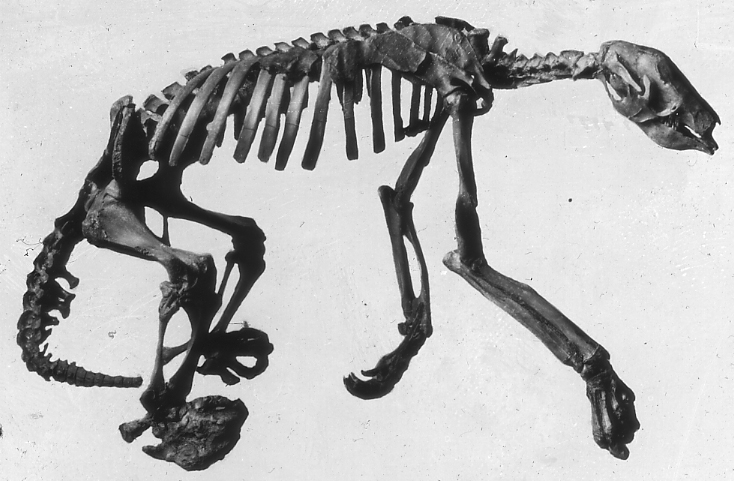
- Shasta ground sloth (Nothrotheriops shastense), Peabody Museum

Scientific classification
- Kingdom: Animalia
- Phylum: Chordata
- Class: Mammalia
- Infraclass: Placentalia
- Order: Pilosa
- Suborder: Folivora
- Superfamily: Megatherioidea
- Clade: †Megatheria
- Family: †Nothrotheriidae (Ameghino 1920) C. de Muizon et al. 2004

Genera
- †Neohapalops; †Thalassocnus?; †Nothrotheriinae (Ameghino, 1920) C. de Muizon et al. 2004; †Amphibradys; †Aymaratherium; †Chasicobradys; †Huilabradys; †Lakukullus; †Mcdonaldocnus; †Mionothropus; †Nothropus; †Nothrotheriops; †Nothrotherium; †Pronothrotherium; †Xyophorus

= Nothrotheriidae =

Nothrotheriidae Temporal range: Early Miocene – Early Holocene (Irvingtonian-Rancholabrean (NALMA) & Santacrucian-Lujanian) (SALMA) ~17.5–0.010 Ma

Extinct family of ground sloths

Nothrotheriidae is a family of extinct ground sloths that lived from approximately 17.5 mya—10,000 years ago, existing for approximately 17.49 million years. Previously placed within the tribe Nothrotheriini or subfamily Nothrotheriinae within Megatheriidae, they are now usually placed in their own family, Nothrotheriidae. Nothrotheriids appeared in the Burdigalian, some 19.8 million years ago, in South America. The group includes the comparatively slightly built Nothrotheriops, which reached a length of about 2.75 metres (9.0 ft). While nothrotheriids were small compared to some of their megatheriid relatives, their claws provided an effective defense against predators, like those of larger anteaters today.

== Evolution ==
It has been proposed that the progressive increase in body sizes among nothrotheriids over their evolution is related to their increasingly terrestrial habits and lifestyles. During the Late Miocene and Pliocene, the sloth genus Thalassocnus of the west coast of South America became adapted to a shallow-water marine lifestyle. However, the family placement of Thalassocnus has been disputed; while long considered a nothrotheriid, one 2017 analysis moves it to Megatheriidae, while another retains it in a basal position within Nothrotheriidae.

The only known nothrotheriid in North America was Nothrotheriops, which appeared at the beginning of the Pleistocene, about 2.6 Ma ago. Nothrotherium reached Mexico (Nuevo Leon) by the late Pleistocene.

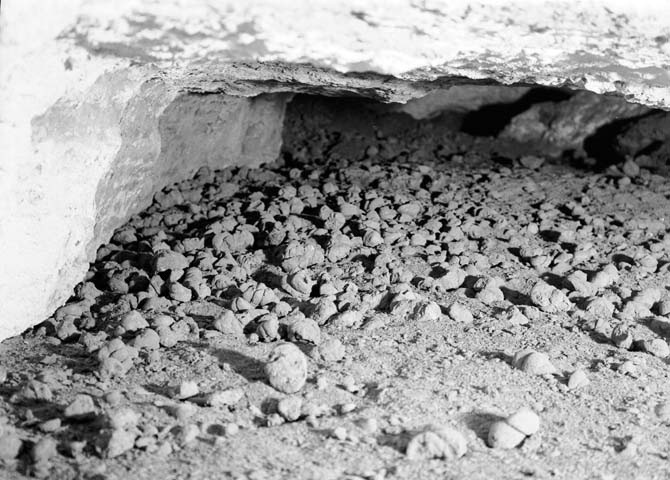
Subfossilized Nothrotheriops shastensis dung in Rampart Cave, Arizona (NPS, 1938)

The last ground sloths in North America belonging to Nothrotheriidae, the Shasta ground sloth (Nothrotheriops shastensis), died so recently that their dried subfossilized dung has remained undisturbed in some caves – such as the Rampart Cave, located on the Arizona side of the Lake Mead National Recreation Area – as if it were just recently deposited. A Shasta ground sloth skeleton, found in a lava tube at Aden Crater in New Mexico, still had skin and hair preserved, and is now at the Yale Peabody Museum. The largest samples of Nothrotheriops dung can be found in the collections of the National Museum of Natural History.

== Phylogeny ==
The following sloth family phylogenetic tree is based on collagen and mitochondrial DNA sequence data (see Fig. 4 of Presslee et al., 2019).

- Folivora
  - † Megalocnidae (Caribbean sloths)
  - - - Mylodontoidea
        - † Scelidotheriidae
        - - † Mylodontidae
          - Choloepodidae (two-toed sloths)
      - Megatherioidea
        - - † Megalonychidae
            † Megalonyx jeffersoni
          - Bradypodidae (three-toed sloths)
            - Bradypus torquatus
            - - Bradypus pygmaeus
              - - Bradypus tridactylus
                - Bradypus variegatus
        - - † Nothrotheriidae
            † Nothrotheriops shastensis
          - † Megatheriidae
            † Megatherium americanum

Here is a more detailed phylogeny of the Nothrotheriidae based on Varela et al. 2018.

- Folivora
  - Pseudoglyptodon
  - - Bradypodidae
      Bradypus
    - Eufolivora
      - Mylodontidae
        - Nematherium
        - - Scelidotheriinae
            - Analcitherium
            - - Neonematherium
              - - Sibyllotherium
                - - Proscelidodon
                  - - Catonyx
                    - - Scelidotherium
                      - Valgipes
          - - Pseudoprepotherium
            - - Orophodontinae?
                - Brievabradys
                - - Octodontotherium
                  - - Paroctodontotherium
                    - - Octomylodon
                      - - Urumacotherium
                        - - Baraguatherium
                          - Octodontobradys
              - Mylodontinae
                - Mylodon
                - - - Thinobadistes
                    - - Lestodon
                      - - Lestobradys
                        - Bolivartherium
                  - - - Simomylodon
                      - Pleurolestodon
                    - - Glossotherium
                      - Paramylodon
      - Megatherioidea
        - - Schismotherium
          - Pelecyodon
        - - Megalonychidae
            - Hapalops
            - - Hyperleptus
              - - Eucholoeops
                - - Pseudortotherium
                  - - Megalonychotherium
                    - - Megalonychinae
                        - Pliometanastes
                        - - Megalonyx
                          - - Australonyx
                            - - Megistonyx
                              - Ahytherium
                      - - Pliomorphus
                        - - Megalocninae
                            - Megalocnus
                            - Parocnus
                          - Choloepodinae
                            - Acratocnus
                            - - Neocnus
                              - Choloepus
          - Megatheria
            - Analcimorphus
            - - Nothrotheriidae
                - Thalassocninae
                  Thalassocnus
                - Nothrotheriinae
                  - Lakukullus
                  - - - Mionothropus
                      - - Nothrotherium
                        - Nothrotheriops
                    - - Pronothrotherium
                      - - Aymaratherium
                        - Xyophorus
              - Megatheriidae
                - Planopsinae
                  - Prepoplanops
                  - - Planops
                    - Prepotherium
                - Megatheriinae
                  - - Diabolotherium
                    - Megathericulus
                  - - Anisodontherium
                    - - Pyramiodontherium
                      - - Proeremotherium
                        - - Eremotherium
                          - Megatherium
