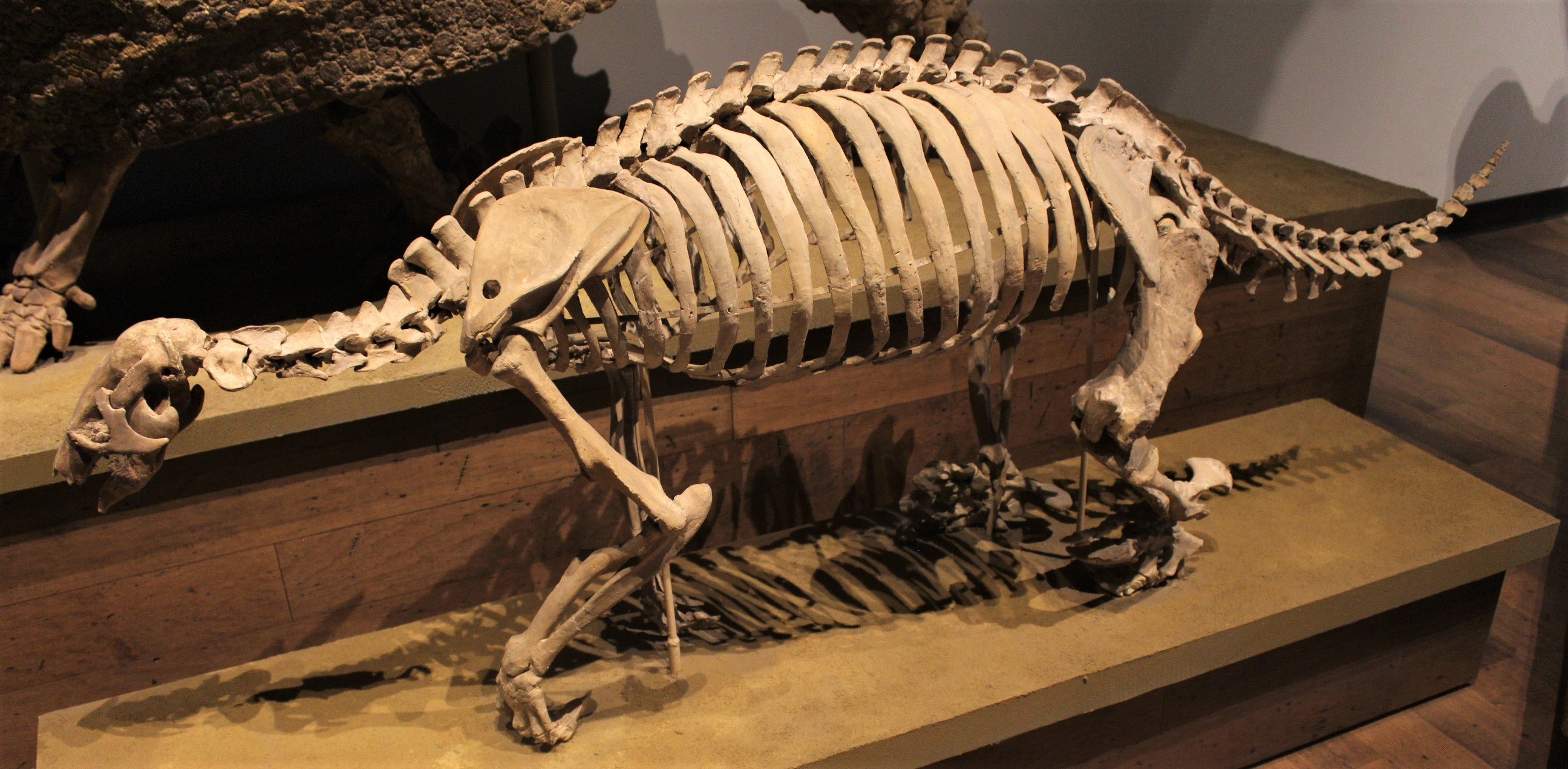
- Skeletal mount of Pronothrotherium typicum, Field Museum of Natural History

Scientific classification
- Domain: Eukaryota
- Kingdom: Animalia
- Phylum: Chordata
- Class: Mammalia
- Order: Pilosa
- Family: †Nothrotheriidae
- Subfamily: †Nothrotheriinae
- Genus: †Pronothrotherium; Ameghino, 1907

Type species
- †Pronothrotherium typicum Ameghino, 1907

Species
- †P. typicum Ameghino 1907; †P. mirabilis Kraglievich 1925

= Pronothrotherium =

Pronothrotherium Temporal range: Late Miocene (Huayquerian) ~9.0–6.8 Ma

Extinct genus of ground sloths

Pronothrotherium is an extinct genus of ground sloths from Argentina and Uruguay. Fossils of Pronothrotherium have been found in the Ituzaingó Formation of Argentina. The body weight of the animal has been estimated at 937 kg (2,066 lb).
