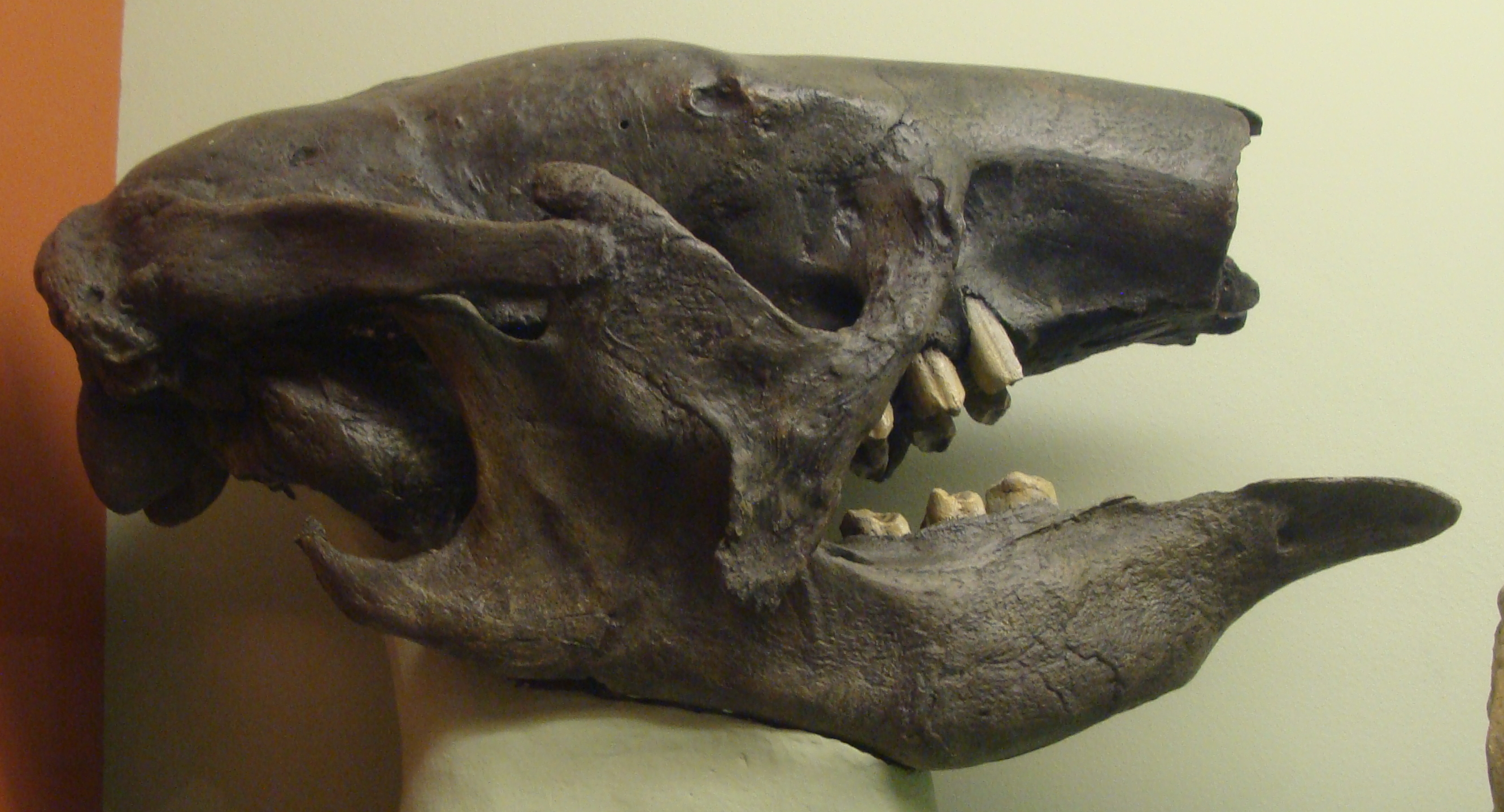
- Skull of Nothrotherium

Scientific classification
- Kingdom: Animalia
- Phylum: Chordata
- Class: Mammalia
- Order: Pilosa
- Family: †Nothrotheriidae
- Subfamily: †Nothrotheriinae
- Genus: †Nothrotherium; Lydekker, 1889

Species
- N. maquinense Lund, 1839; N. escrivanense Reinhardt, 1878

Synonyms
- Coelodon Lund, 1838; Caelodon Lund, 1839; Coclodon Lund, 1839; Cyclodon Lund, 1839; Toelodon Lund, 1840; Hypocoelus Ameghino, 1891

= Nothrotherium =

Nothrotherium Temporal range: Early Pleistocene-Early Holocene (Uquian-Lujanian) ~1.8–0.010 Ma

Extinct genus of ground sloths

Nothrotherium is an extinct genus of medium-sized ground sloth from South America (Bolivia, Brazil and the Ware Formation, La Guajira, Colombia). It differs from Nothrotheriops in smaller size and differences in skull and hind leg bones.

== Taxonomy ==
Nothrotherium is derived from the Greek nothros [νωθρός], meaning "lazy" or "slothful," and therion [θηρίον], "beast", and the type species N. maquinense is named after the Maquiné Grotto in Brazil, where it was found. Synonyms such as Coelodon occasionally cause confusion where they occur in early texts such as that of Alfred Russel Wallace's major work, The Geographical Distribution of Animals (1876). This genus formerly included the species Nothrotheriops shastensis, which was later moved to Nothrotheriops.

== Palaeobiology ==
=== Palaeoecology ===
Analysis of δ^{13}C values of N. maquinense remains suggests that they were specialists feeding predominantly on C_{3} vegetation. Analysis of a coprolite associated with a N. maquinense skeleton in Brazil's Gruta dos Brejoes show it to have been a browser which fed on xerophytic leaves and fruits, and it is sometimes thought to have been an inhabitant of open, peripheral forests, possibly having a semi-arboreal lifestyle, like the contemporaneous Cuban ground sloths and Diabolotherium.

=== Palaeopathology ===
Based on a fossil find from Lapa dos Peixes I, the species N. maquinense is known to have suffered from calcium pyrophosphate deposition disease.

== Extinction ==
Plant material in the Gruta dos Brejoes coprolite yielded a date of 12,200 ± 120 yr BP, indicating that it survived long enough to encounter the first humans in South America and that it went extinct as part of the Late Pleistocene extinction event.
