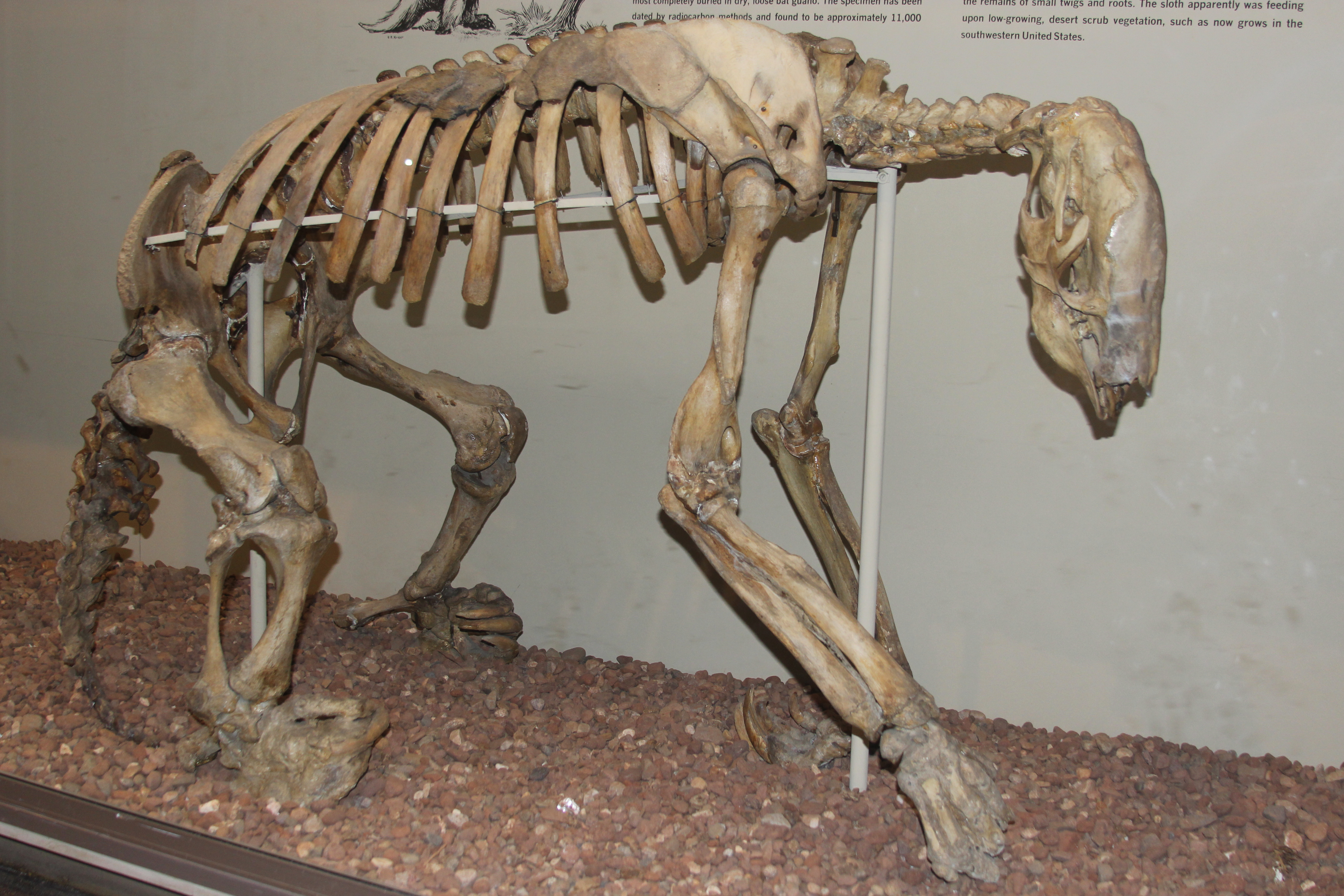
- N. shastensis skeleton with preserved skin, Yale Peabody Museum
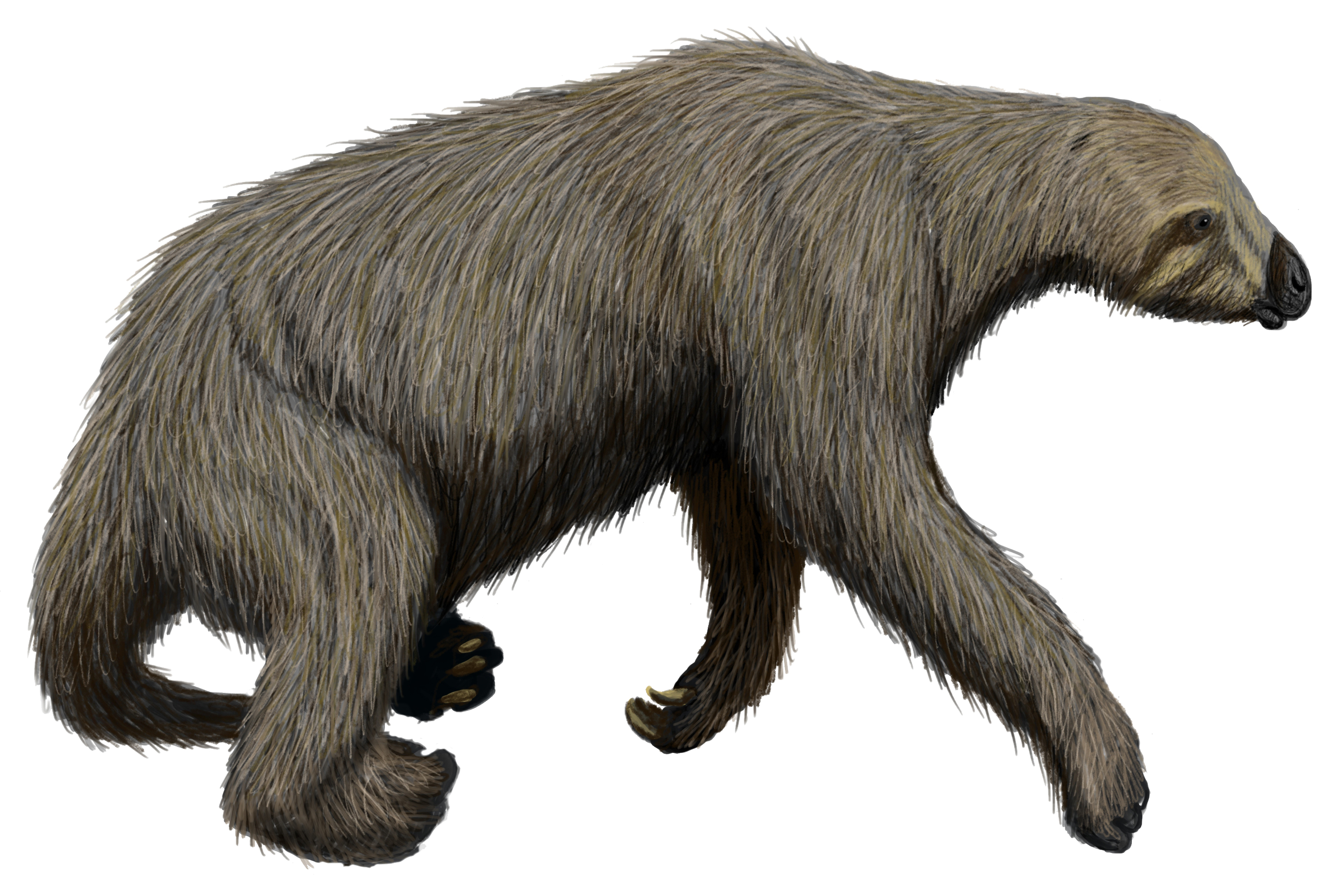
- Restoration of N. shastensis

Scientific classification
- Kingdom: Animalia
- Phylum: Chordata
- Class: Mammalia
- Order: Pilosa
- Suborder: Folivora
- Family: †Nothrotheriidae
- Subfamily: †Nothrotheriinae
- Genus: †Nothrotheriops; Hoffstetter, 1954

Type species
- †Nothrotheriops shastensis Sinclair, 1905

Species
- †N. shastensis (Sinclair 1905); †N. texanus (Hay 1916)

= Nothrotheriops =

Nothrotheriops Temporal range: 2.5–0.011 Ma Pleistocene - Early Holocene

Extinct genus of ground sloths

Nothrotheriops is an extinct genus of ground sloths endemic to North America during the Pleistocene to early Holocene (~2.5 Mya until 10,000 years ago). The genus contains two species, N. shastensis and N. texanus, the former of which is also known as the Shasta ground sloth.

== Taxonomy, history, and etymology ==
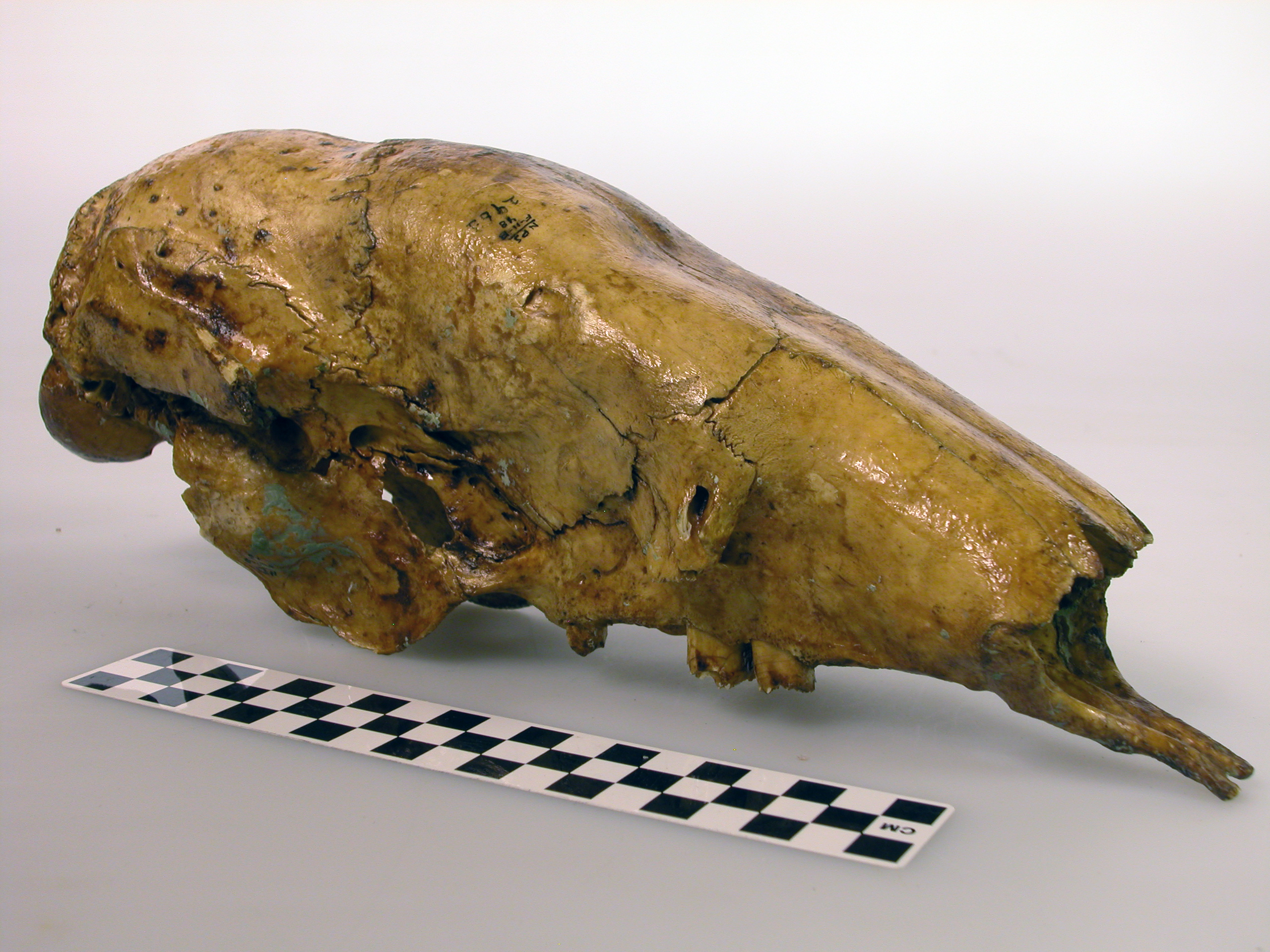
N. shastensis skull

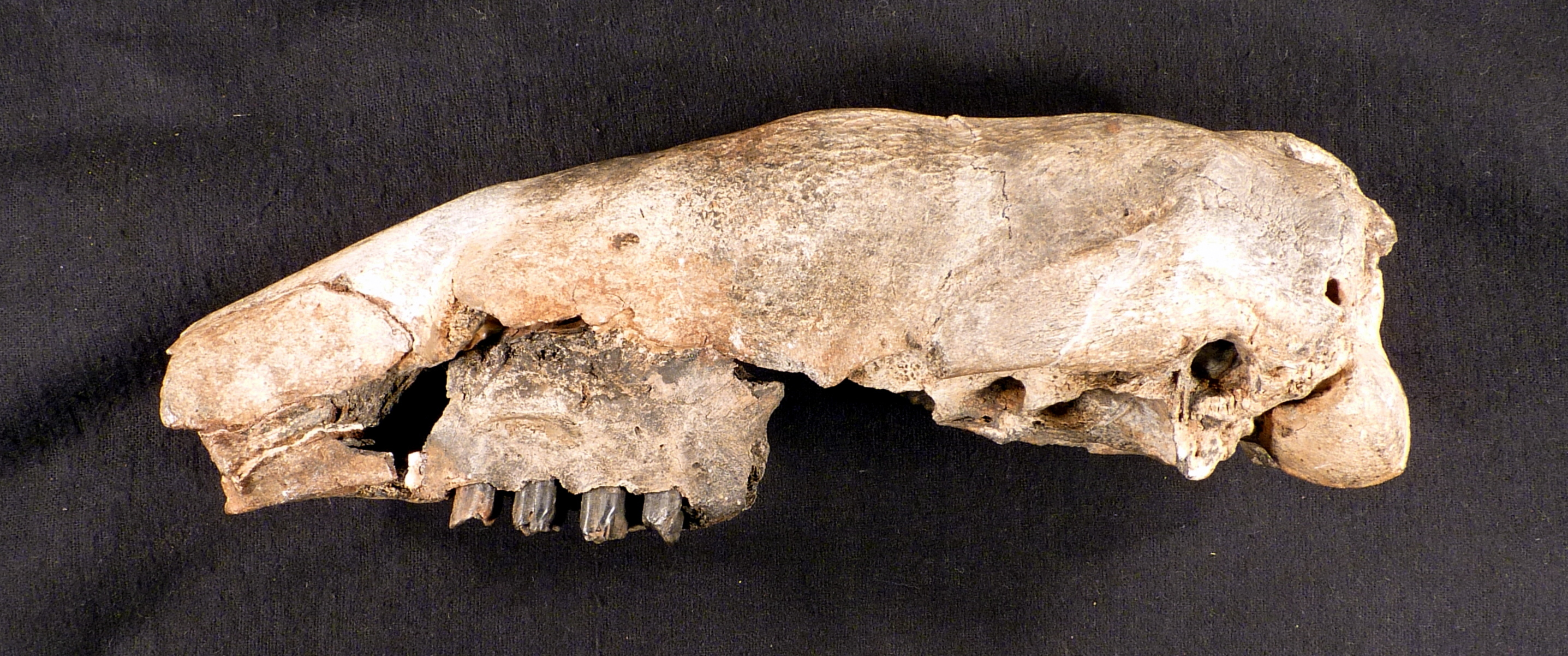
Holotype skull of N. texanus

Nothrotheriops fossils were first collected by the University of California's Anthropology Department during an exploration of caves at Potter Creek Cave in Shasta County, California, the fossils dating to the late Quaternary period. These first fossils (UCMP 8422), consisting of an incomplete mandibular ramus lacking teeth of an individual and 14 additional molars, were sent to the University of California Museum of Paleontology, where they were described by paleontologist William Sinclair in 1904 as a new species of Nothrotherium, N. shastensis (species name meaning "from Shasta"). In 1916, Smithsonian paleontologist Oliver P. Hay named Nothrotherium texanus (species name meaning "from Texas") based on a partial skull that was transferred from Baylor University in Waco, Texas. The skull had been collected in the Pleistocene strata of Wheeler County, Texas, and given to a clergyman, who then gave it to university staff in 1901. Many fossils were later referred to the two, but N. shastensis was not placed in a new genus until 1954, when it was placed in a new genus, Nothrotheriops ("near slothful beast", due to its similarity to Nothrotherium) by Robert Hoffstetter during a study of fossil sloths. N. texanus was recombined into the genus in 1995, and had many fossils referred to it from Florida, the easternmost occurrence of the genus.

Fossils of the best-known species, the Shasta ground sloth (N. shastensis), have been found throughout western North America, especially in the American Southwest. It is the ground sloth found in greatest abundance at the La Brea Tar Pits. The most famous specimen was recovered from a lava tube at Aden Crater in New Mexico, and was found to still have hair and tendon preserved. This nearly complete specimen is on display at the Yale Peabody Museum of Natural History in New Haven, Connecticut. Numerous dung boli belonging to Nothrotheriops have also been found throughout the Southwestern United States and have provided an insight into the diet of these extinct animals.

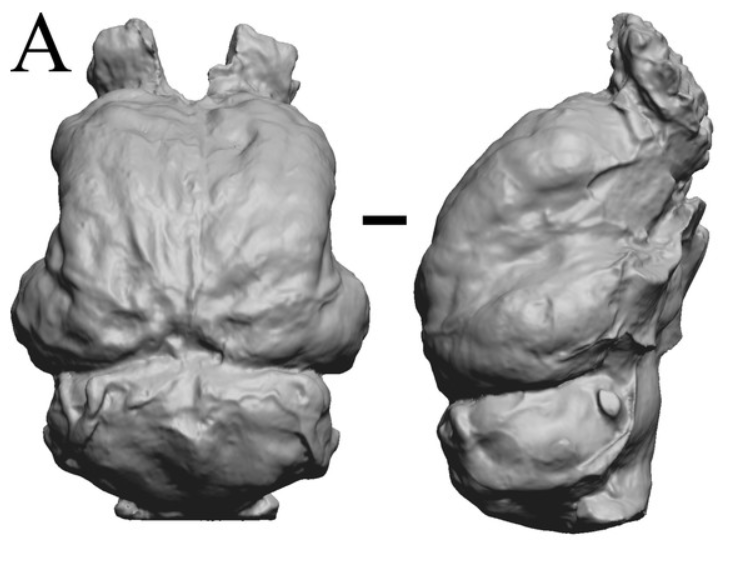
Digital endocast of the cranial cavity of N. shastensis (LACMHC 1800-6).

This genus's lineage dates back to the Miocene. The ancestors of Nothrotheriops migrated to North America from South America as part of the Great American Interchange during the Blancan, about 2.58 million years ago.

== Description ==
Although N. shastensis was one of the smallest mainland ground sloth species, it still reached 2.75 m (9.0 ft) from snout to tail tip and weighed 250 kg (551 lb) (one-quarter of a tonne) – much smaller than some of its contemporary species such as the Eremotherium, which could easily weigh over two tonnes and be 6 m (20 ft) long. It had large, stout hind legs and a powerful, muscular tail that it used to form a supporting tripod whenever it shifted from a quadrupedal to a bipedal stance (i.e. Eremotherium).

== Paleobiology ==
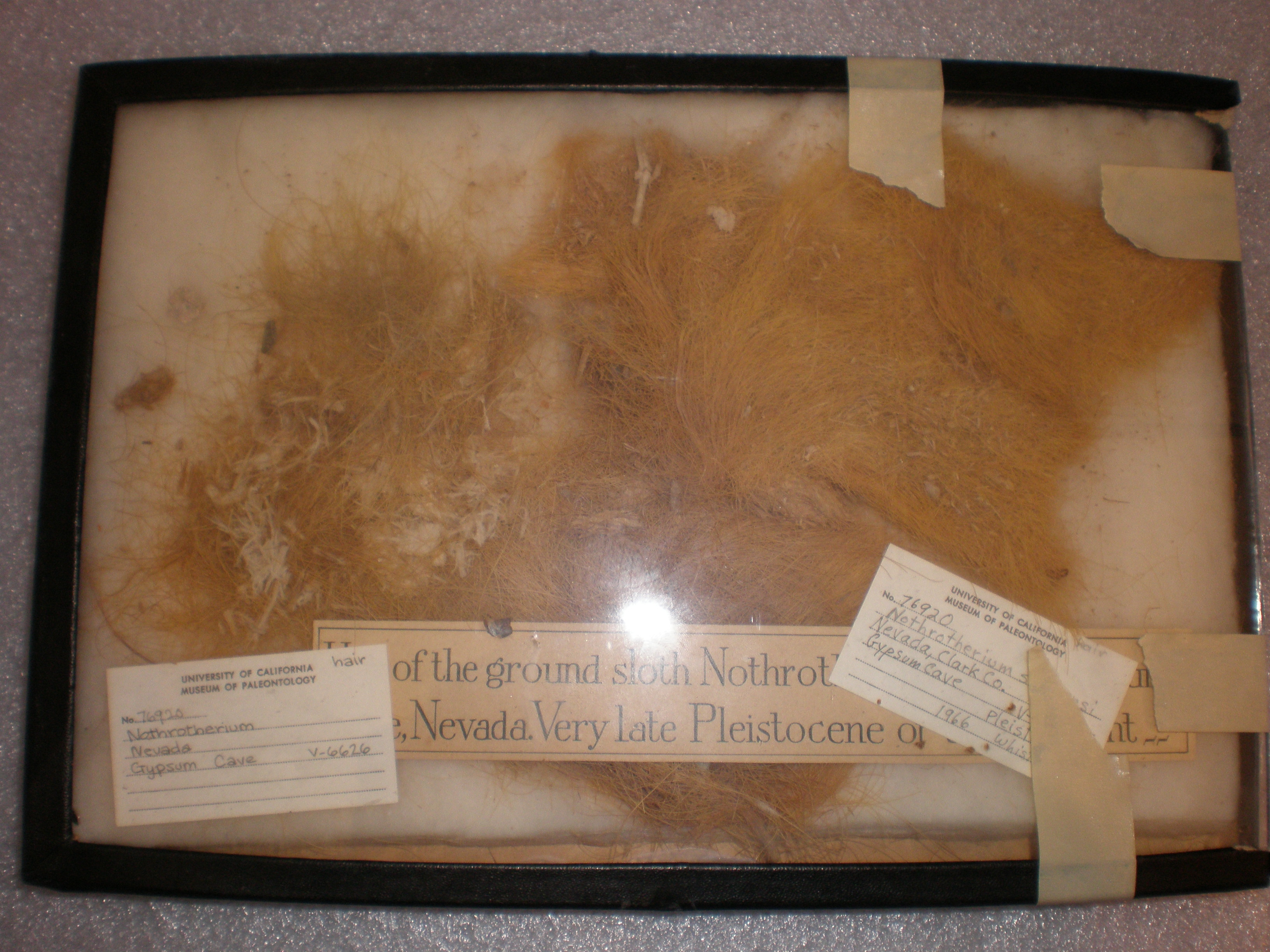
Skin discovered in Gypsum Cave, Nevada

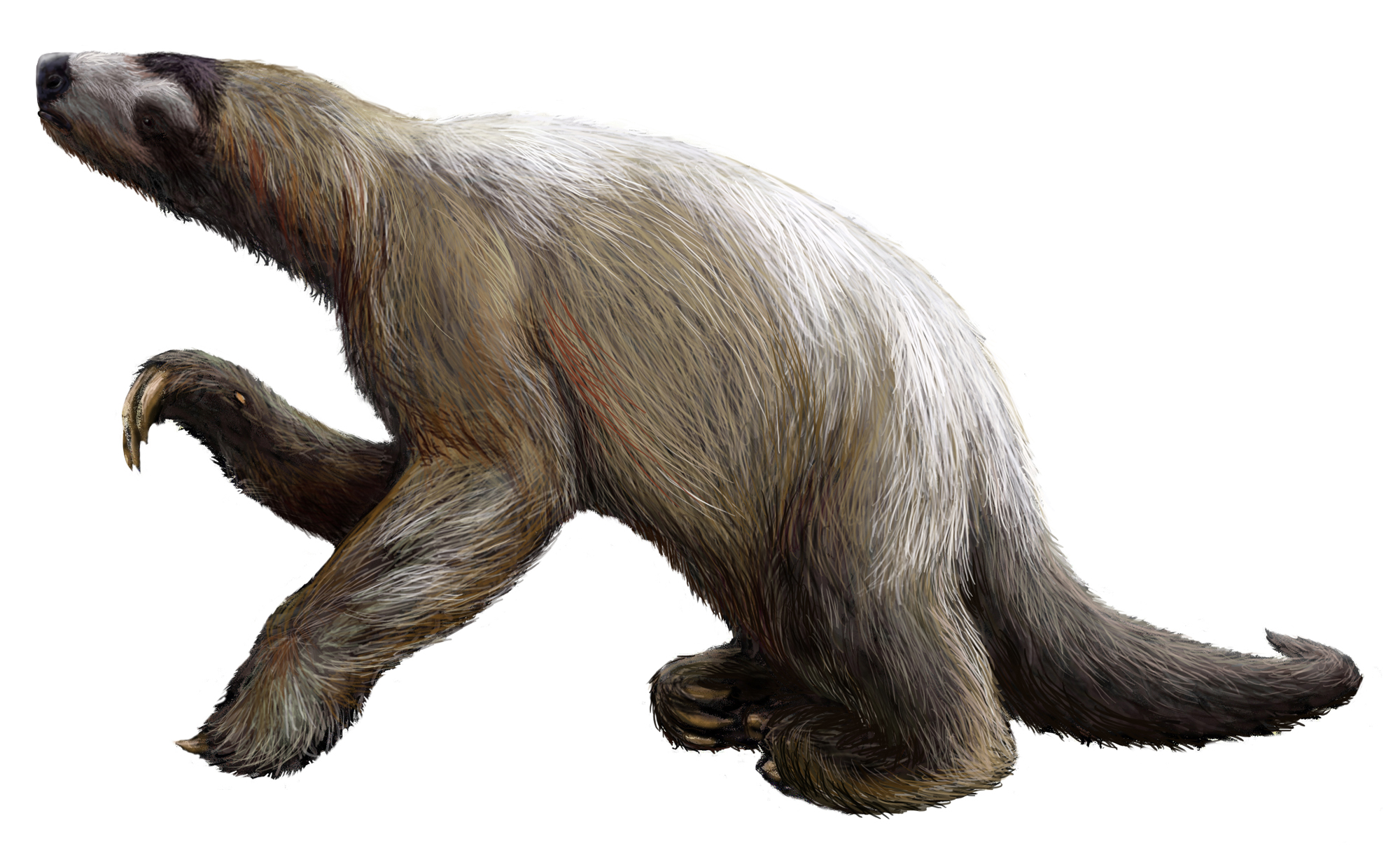
Restoration of N. texanus

Nothrotheriops behaved like all typical ground sloths of North and South America, feeding on various plants, such as the desert globemallow, cacti, and yucca. It was hunted by various local predators, including dire wolves and Smilodon, from which the sloths may have defended themselves by standing upright on hind legs and tail, and swiping with their long fore claws, like their distant relative Megatherium, as conjectured in the BBC series Walking with Beasts. The same claws could also have been used as tools to reach past the plant spines and grab softer flowers and fruits. Also, the Shasta ground sloth may have had a prehensile tongue (like a giraffe) to strip leaves off branches. The dental microwear of N. shastensis is consistent with it being folivorous, being very similar to extant xenarthrans that feed on leaves. By engaging in folivory, N. shastensis was able to partition its resources with the contemporary Paramylodon harlani, which mainly consumed tubers, roots, seeds, and fruit pits. The δ^{34}S value of a N. shastensis from Rancho La Brea suggests that it was a fairly sedentary animal that did not migrate, and its δ^{13}C value suggests that it occupied an open landscape dominated by C_{3} plants.

The Shasta ground sloth is believed to have played an important role in the dispersal of Yucca brevifolia, or Joshua tree, seeds. Preserved dung belonging to the sloth has been found to contain Joshua tree leaves and seeds, confirming that they fed on the trees. The lack of Shasta ground sloths helping to disperse the seeds to more favourable climates may be causing the tree populations to suffer.

== Distribution and habitat ==
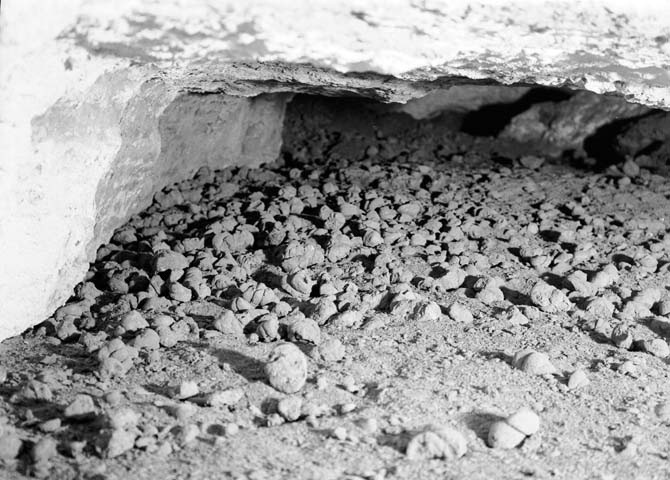
Subfossilized N. shastensis dung in Rampart Cave, Arizona (NPS, 1938)

A fossil find had been described from as far north as the Canadian province of Alberta, but this report is believed to have been mistaken. The genus lived primarily in the southwestern region of the U.S., from the states of Texas and Oklahoma to California; it has also been found in Florida.

The best-known historical specimen was found in a lava tube at Aden Crater in New Mexico; it was found with hair and tendon still preserved. The Rampart Cave, located on the Arizona side of the Lake Mead National Recreation Area, has a plentiful amount of the sloth's hair and dung, both of which scientists used for radiocarbon dating to establish when it lived. The most recent credible dates from this and each of about half a dozen other southwestern caves are about 11,000 BP (13,000 cal BP). In addition to North America, fossils assigned to Nothrotheriops species have also been found as far south as Argentina's Santa Fe Province. The youngest known bone of a single Shasta ground sloth (N. shastensis) individual from the Devil Peak (Nevada) is dated to the early Holocene, approximately 11,768-10787 calibrated years Before Present, with dung remains from other localities also dated to the early Holocene.
