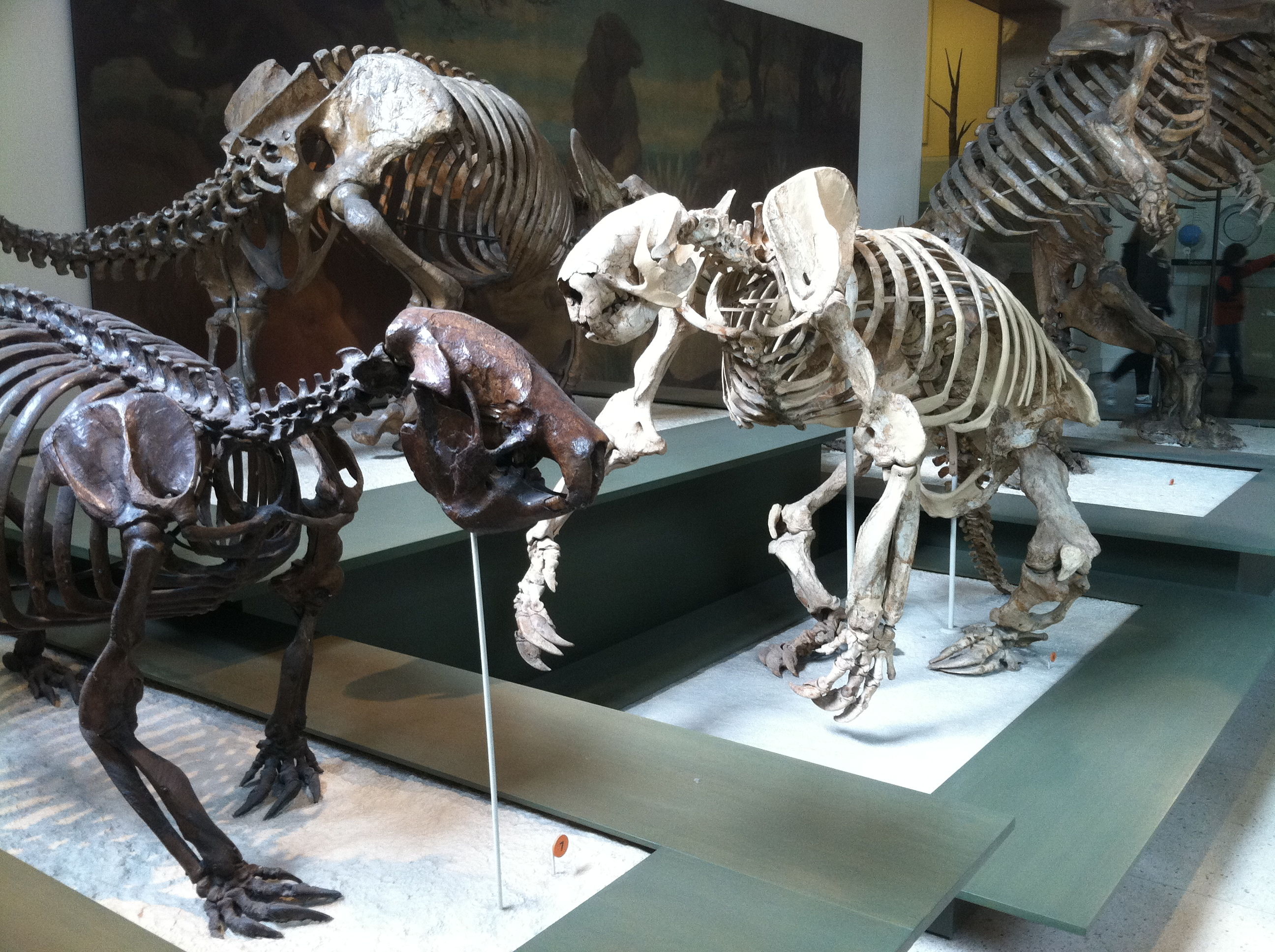
- American Museum of Natural History mounts of (from left) Megalocnus rodens, Scelidotherium cuvieri, Megalonyx wheatleyi, Glossotherium robustus

Scientific classification
- Kingdom: Animalia
- Phylum: Chordata
- Class: Mammalia
- Order: Pilosa
- Suborder: Folivora

Families
- †Megalocnidae (in part); †Megalonychidae; †Megatheriidae; †Nothrotheriidae; †Mylodontidae; †Scelidotheriidae

= Ground sloth =

Ground sloths Temporal range: 35–0.005 Ma Late Eocene – Holocene

Diverse group of extinct sloth species

Ground sloths are a diverse group of extinct sloths in the mammalian superorder Xenarthra. They varied widely in size; the largest belonged to the genera Lestodon, Eremotherium and Megatherium, and were roughly the size of modern-day elephants. Ground sloths represent a paraphyletic group, as living tree sloths are thought to have evolved from ground sloth ancestors.

The early evolution of ground sloths took place during the late Paleogene and Neogene of South America, while the continent was isolated. At their earliest appearance in the fossil record, they were already distinct at the family level. Sloths dispersed into the Greater Antilles during the Oligocene, and the presence of intervening islands between the American continents in the Miocene allowed a dispersal of some species into North America. They were hardy as evidenced by their high species diversity and their presence in a wide variety of environments, extending from the far south of Patagonia (Cueva del Milodón Natural Monument) to Alaska. Sloths, and xenarthrans as a whole, represent one of the more successful South American groups during the Great American Interchange after the connection of North and South America during the late Pliocene, with a number of ground sloth genera migrating northward. One genus, Thalassocnus, was adapted to marine life along the Pacific coast of South America during the late Miocene and Pliocene epochs.

Ground sloths, which were represented by over 30 living species during the Late Pleistocene, abruptly became extinct on the American mainland as part of the end-Pleistocene extinction event around 12,000 years ago, simultaneously with the majority of other large animals in the Americas. Their extinction has been posited to be the result of hunting by recently arrived humans and/or climate change. A number of known kill sites, where ground sloths were butchered by humans, date to just prior to their extinction.

The Caribbean ground sloths, the most recent survivors, lived on Cuba, Hispaniola, and Puerto Rico, possibly until 1550 BCE. However, radiocarbon dating suggests an age of between 2819 and 2660 BCE for the last occurrence of Megalocnus in Cuba. They survived 5,000–6,000 years longer in the Caribbean than on the American mainland, which correlates with the later colonization of this area by humans.

== Description ==
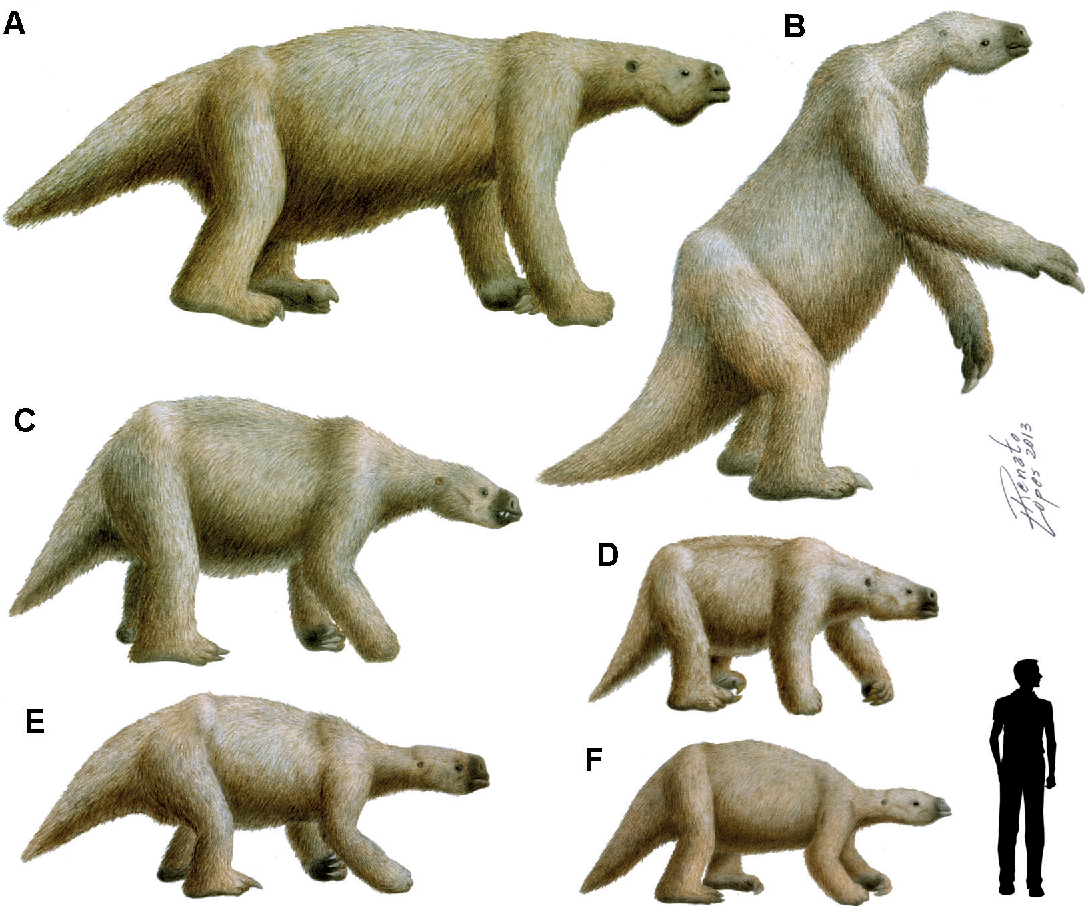
Size comparison of various ground sloths compared to a human, including Megatherium americanum (A, top left) Eremotherium laurillardi (B, top right), Lestodon armatus (C, middle left) Mylodon darwinii (D, middle right) Glossotherium robustum (E, bottom left) and Catonyx cf. C. cuvieri (F, bottom right)

Ground sloths varied widely in size from under 100 kilograms (220 lb) in the Caribbean ground sloths, to 3,700–4,100 kilograms (8,200–9,000 lb) in the largest ground sloth genera Megatherium, Lestodon and Eremotherium. The bodies of ground sloths were generally barrel-shaped, with a broad pelvis. The skull shapes of ground sloths are highly variable. Like other xenarthrans, the adult teeth of ground sloths lacked enamel, with the tooth surface being composed of relatively soft orthodentine. The number of teeth in the jaws is considerably reduced in comparison to other mammals, with most ground sloths only having 5 and 4 teeth in each half of the upper and lower jaws respectively, with some ground sloths exhibiting further tooth number reduction. These teeth were rootless and were continuously growing (hypselodont), and typically have a relatively simple morphology. There are generally no teeth at the front of the jaws. In order to be able to grasp food, those whose skulls exhibit narrow muzzles are likely to have had prehensile, black rhinoceros-like upper lips, while those with wider muzzles are likely to have had a square, white rhinoceros like upper-lip, used in combination with mobile tongues. Some ground sloths have canine-like teeth at the front of the jaws separated from the other teeth by a gap (diastema). The hands of ground sloths have ungual phalanges that indicate that they had well developed claws. In many ground sloth families (Megatheriidae, Mylodontidae, Scelidotheriidae and Nothrotheriidae), the hindfoot is inwardly rotated, meaning sole faces inwards and that the body weight was primarily borne on the fifth metatarsus and the calcaneum.

== Ecology ==
Ground sloths are generally regarded as herbivores, with some being browsers, others grazers, and some intermediate between the two as mixed feeders (both browsing and grazing), though a number of authors have argued that some ground sloths may have been omnivores. Sloths that had longer snouts are presumed to have had greater olfactory acuity, but appear to have also had less binocular vision and poorer ability to localize sounds. A number of extinct sloth species are thought to have had hearing abilities optimized for low frequencies, perhaps related to use of infrasound for communication. Some ground sloths are suggested to have dug burrows. Their skeletal anatomy suggests that they were incapable of running, and relied on other strategies to defend against predators, though they were likely significantly more active and agile than living tree sloths. Ground sloths were likely able to adopt a bipedal stance while stationary, allowing the forelimbs to be used to grasp vegetation as well as to use their claws for defence, though whether they were capable of moving in this posture is uncertain. Some ground sloths have been suggested to be able to climb. Some authors have suggested ground sloths were largely solitary animals, like living sloths, though other authors have argued that at least some ground sloths are likely to have engaged in gregarious behaviour. Whether or not ground sloths had a slow metabolism like living xenarthrans (including living sloths) is debated.

Like living sloths, ground sloths likely only gave birth to a single offspring at a time, with likely several years between the birth of offspring. At least some ground sloths engaged in long-term parental care, with one adult (presumably female) Megalonyx found with two juveniles of different ages, with the oldest juvenile suggested to be 3–4 years old. Juvenile ground sloths may have clung to the body of their mother for some time following birth, as occurs in living tree sloths.

== Evolution ==
The earliest unambiguous fossil evidence of ground sloths comes from the early Oligocene. Ground sloths had dispersed into the Caribbean already by 31 million years ago, as evidenced by a femur found in Puerto Rico. During the Miocene, sloths diversified, with the major families of sloths appearing during this period, with diversity waxing and waning over the course of the Miocene. Megalonychid and mylodontid sloths had migrated into North America by the Late Miocene, around 10 million years ago. At the end of the Miocene, ground sloth diversity declined, though their diversity would remain largely stable throughout the Pliocene and Pleistocene periods, up until their extinction. During the Pliocene and Pleistocene, as part of the Great American Interchange, additional lineages of sloths migrated into Central and North America. Prior to their extinction, there were over 30 living species of ground sloths across the Americas during the Late Pleistocene.

== Families ==
Paleontologists assign more than 80 genera of ground sloths to multiple families.

=== Megalonychidae ===
The megalonychid ground sloths first appeared in the Late Eocene, about 35 million years ago, in Patagonia. Megalonychids first reached North America by island-hopping, prior to the formation of the Isthmus of Panama. Some lineages of megalonychids increased in size as time progressed. The first species of these were small and may have been partly tree-dwelling, whereas the Pliocene (about 5 to 2 million years ago) species were already approximately half the size of the huge Late Pleistocene Megalonyx jeffersonii from the last ice age. Some West Indian island species were as small as a large cat; their dwarf condition typified both tropical adaptation and their restricted island environment. This small size also enabled them a degree of arboreality.

Megalonyx, which means "giant claw", was a widespread North American genus that lived past the close of the last (Wisconsin) glaciation, when so many large mammals died out. Remains have been found as far north as Alaska and the Yukon. Ongoing excavations at Tarkio Valley in southwestern Iowa may reveal something of the familial life of Megalonyx. An adult was found in direct association with two juveniles of different ages, suggesting that adults cared for young of different generations.

The earliest known North American megalonychid, Pliometanastes protistus, lived in the southern U.S. about 9 million years ago and is believed to have been the predecessor of Megalonyx. Several species of Megalonyx have been named; in fact it has been stated that "nearly every good specimen has been described as a different species". A broader perspective on the group, accounting for age, sex, individual and geographic differences, indicates that only three species are valid (M. leptostomus, M. wheatleyi, and M. jeffersonii) in the late Pliocene and Pleistocene of North America, although work by McDonald lists five species. Jefferson's ground sloth has a special place in modern paleontology, for Thomas Jefferson's letter on Megalonyx, read before the American Philosophical Society of Philadelphia in August 1796, marked the beginning of vertebrate paleontology in North America. When Lewis and Clark set out, Jefferson instructed Meriwether Lewis to keep an eye out for ground sloths. He was hoping they would find some living in the Western range. Megalonyx jeffersonii was appropriately named after Thomas Jefferson.

=== Megatheriidae ===
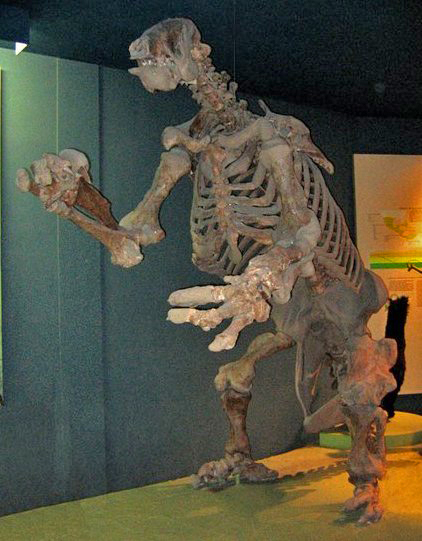
Fossil Eremotherium skeleton, National Museum of Natural History, Washington, DC

The megatheriid ground sloths are relatives of the megalonychids; these two families, along with the family Nothrotheriidae, form the infraorder Megatheria. Megatheriids appeared later in the Oligocene, some 30 million years ago, also in South America. The group includes the heavily built Megatherium (given its name 'great beast' by Georges Cuvier) and Eremotherium, which are the largest known ground sloths, thought to have had body masses of 3.5-4 tons. The skeletal structure of these ground sloths indicates that the animals were massive. Their thick bones and even thicker joints (especially those on the hind legs) gave their appendages tremendous power that, combined with their size and fearsome claws, provided a formidable defense against predators.

The earliest megatheriid in North America was Eremotherium eomigrans which arrived 2.2 million years ago, after crossing the recently formed Panamanian land bridge. With more than five tons in weight, 6 meters in length, and able to reach as high as 17 feet (5.2 m), it was larger than an African bush elephant bull. Unlike relatives, this species retained a plesiomorphic extra claw. While other species of Eremotherium had four fingers with only two or three claws, E. eomigrans had five fingers, four of them with claws up to nearly a foot long.

=== Nothrotheriidae ===
Recently recognized, ground sloths of Nothrotheriidae are often associated with those of the Megatheriidae, and together the two form the superfamily Megatherioidea. The most prominent members of the group are the South American genus Thalassocnus, known for being aquatic, and Nothrotheriops from North America.

The last ground sloths in North America belonging to Nothrotheriops died so recently that their subfossil dung has remained undisturbed in some caves. One of the skeletons, found in a lava tube (cave) at Aden Crater, adjacent to Kilbourne Hole, New Mexico, still had skin and hair preserved, and is now at the Yale Peabody Museum. The largest samples of Nothrotheriops dung can be found in the collections of the Smithsonian Museum. Another Nothrotheriops was excavated at Shelter Cave, also in Doña Ana County, New Mexico.

=== Mylodontidae ===
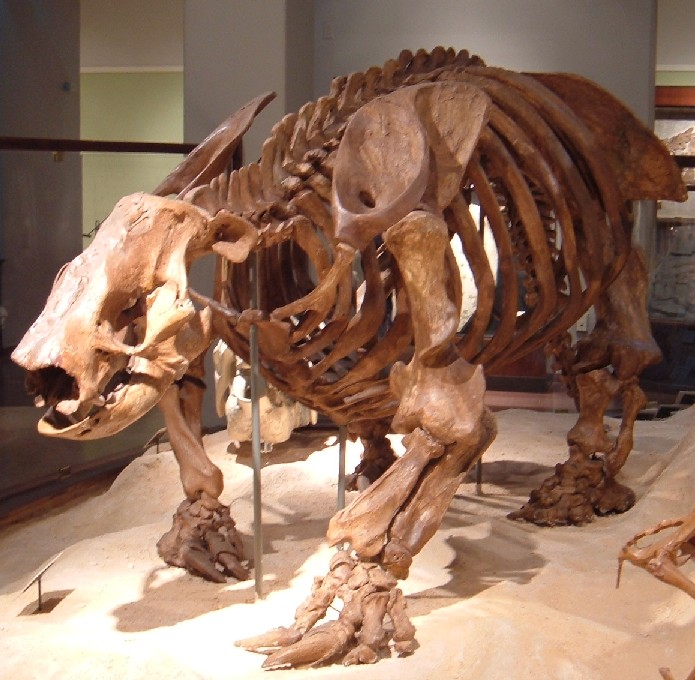
Paramylodon harlani, Texas Memorial Museum, University of Texas at Austin

The mylodontid ground sloths together with their relatives the scelidotheriids form the Mylodontoidea, the second radiation of ground sloths. The discovery of their fossils in caverns associated with human occupation led some early researchers to theorize that the early humans built corrals when they could procure a young ground sloth, to raise the animal to butchering size. However, radiocarbon dates do not support simultaneous occupation of the site by humans and sloths. Subfossil remains like coproliths, fur and skin have been discovered in some quantities. The American Museum of Natural History has exhibited a sample of Mylodon dung from Argentina with a note that reads "deposited by Theodore Roosevelt". Mylodontids are the only ground sloths confirmed to have had osteoderms embedded within their skin, though osteoderms were only present in a handful of genera and absent in many others.

The largest mylodontid is Lestodon, with an estimated mass of 3,400–4,100 kilograms (7,500–9,000 lb).

=== Scelidotheriidae ===
The ground sloth family Scelidotheriidae was demoted in 1995 to the subfamily Scelidotheriinae within Mylodontidae. Based on collagen sequence data showing that its members are more distant from other mylodontids than Choloepodidae, it was elevated back to full family status in 2019. Together with Mylodontidae, the enigmatic Pseudoprepotherium and two-toed sloths, the scelidotheriids form the superfamily Mylodontoidea. Chubutherium is an ancestral and very plesiomorphic member of this subfamily and does not belong to the main group of closely related genera, which include Scelidotherium and Catonyx.

=== Phylogeny ===
The following sloth family phylogenetic tree is based on collagen and mitochondrial DNA sequence data (see Fig. 4 of Presslee et al.., 2019).

- Folivora
  - † Megalocnidae (Caribbean sloths)
    - † Neocnus dousman
    - - - † Parocnus serus
        - † Neocnus comes
      - † Acratocnus ye
  - - - Megatherioidea
        - - † Nothrotheriidae
            † Nothrotheriops shastensis
          - † Megatheriidae
            † Megatherium americanum
        - - † Megalonychidae
            † Megalonyx jeffersoni
          - Bradypodidae (three-fingered sloths)
            5 living spp.
      - Mylodontoidea
        - - † Scelidotheriidae
            - † Scelidotherium sp.
            - † Scelidodon sp.
        - - Choloepodidae (two-fingered sloths)
            2 living spp.
          - † Mylodontidae
            - † Lestodon armatus
            - - † Paramylodon harlani
              - - † Mylodon darwinii
                - † Glossotherium robustus

== Extinction ==
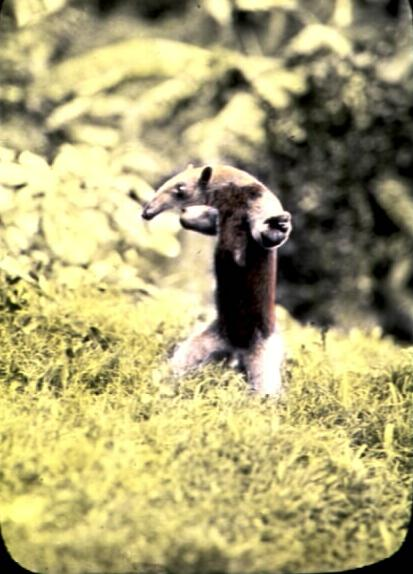
A Tamandua anteater in an upright defensive stance similar to those presumed to have been adopted by ground sloths, per trackways preserved in New Mexico

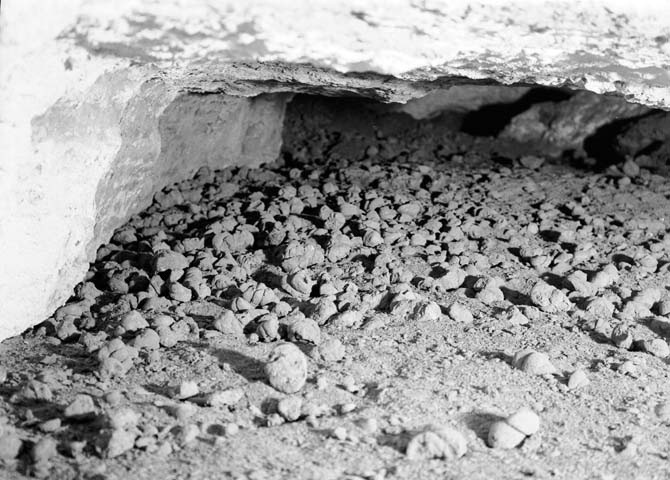
Subfossilized Nothrotheriops shastensis dung in Rampart Cave, Arizona (NPS, 1938)

Radiocarbon dating places the disappearance of ground sloths in what is now the United States at around 11,000 years ago. The Shasta ground sloth (Nothrotheriops shastensis) visited Rampart Cave (located on the Arizona side of the Lake Mead National Recreation Area) seasonally, leaving behind a massive stratified subfossilized dung deposit, and seemed to be flourishing from 13,000 until 11,000 BP, when the deposition suddenly stopped. Steadman et al. argue that it is no coincidence that studies have shown that ground sloths disappeared from an area a few years after the arrival of humans. Trackways preserved in New Mexico (probably dating from 10 to 15.6 thousand years ago) that appear to show a group of humans chasing or harassing three Nothrotheriops or Paramylodon ground sloths may record the scene of a hunt. The tracks are interpreted as showing seven instances of a sloth turning and rearing up on its hind legs to confront its pursuers, while the humans approach from multiple directions, possibly in an attempt to distract it.

Those who argue in favor of humans being the direct cause of the ground sloths' extinction point out that the few sloths that remain are small sloths that spend most of their time in trees, making it difficult for them to be spotted. Although these sloths were well hidden, they still would have been affected by the climate changes that others claim wiped out the ground sloths. Additionally, after the continental ground sloths disappeared, insular sloths of the Caribbean survived for approximately 6,000 years longer, which correlates with the fact that these islands were not colonized by humans until about 5500 yr BP.

It is difficult to find evidence that supports either claim on whether humans hunted the ground sloths to extinction. Removing large amounts of meat from large mammals such as the ground sloth requires no contact with the bones; tool-inflicted damage to bones is a key sign of human interaction with the animal.

=== Hunting of ground sloths ===
==== Kill sites ====
A number of kill sites are known for ground sloths in the Americas, these include Campo Laborde in the Pampas of Argentina, where an individual of Megatherium americanum was butchered at the edge of a swamp, dating to approximately 12,600 years Before Present (BP), with another potential Megatherium kill site being Arroyo Seco 2 in the same region, dating to approximately 14,782–11,142 cal yr BP. In northern Ohio, a Megalonyx jeffersoni skeleton dubbed the "Firelands Ground Sloth" has cut marks indicative of butchery, dating to 13,738 to 13,435 years BP. At the Santa Elina rockshelter in Mato Grosso Brazil, a specimen of Glossotherium is associated with hearths and stone tools, dating to 11,833–11,804 years BP. At Fell's Cave in southern Chilean Patagonia, a specimen of Mylodon with fractured and burned bones associated with human activity has been dated to approximately 12,766–12,354 years BP.

==== Hunting weapons ====
Humans are believed to have entered the New World via Beringia, a land bridge which connected Asia and North America during the last glacial maximum. Mosimann and Martin (1975) suggested the first of these nomads descended from hunting families who had acquired the skills to track down and kill large mammals. By this time, humans had developed proficient hunting weapons, including the Clovis points, which were narrow, carved stone projectiles used specifically for big game. A couple of hundred years later, the atlatl became widely used, which allowed them to throw spears with greater velocity. These inventions would have allowed hunters to put distance between them and their prey, potentially making it less dangerous to approach ground sloths.

==== Advantages ====
Certain characteristics and behavioral traits of the ground sloths made them easy targets for human hunting and provided hunter-gatherers with strong incentives to hunt these large mammals.

Ground sloths often fed in open fields. Recent studies have attempted to discover the diet of ground sloths through fossils of their dung. Analysis of these coproliths have found that ground sloths often ate the foliage of trees, hard grasses, shrubs, and yucca; these plants were located in areas that would have exposed them, making them susceptible to human predation. Ground sloths were not only easy to spot, but had never interacted with humans before, so would not have known how to react to them. Additionally, these large mammals waddled on their hind legs and front knuckles, keeping their claws turned in. Their movement and massive build (some weighed up to 3,000 kilograms (6,600 lb) imply they were relatively slow mammals.

These reasonable after-the-fact inferences from the evidence might explain why ground sloths would have been easy prey for hunters, but are not certain.

==== Difficulties ====
While ground sloths would have been relatively easy to spot and approach, big game hunters' weapons would have been useless from farther than 9.1 metres (30 ft) away. It would have been difficult to take down a ground sloth with a spear-thrower and would have required extensive knowledge of the species. Additionally, the ground sloths' already thick hide was fortified by osteoderms, making it difficult to penetrate.

Since ground sloths thrived in an environment filled with large predators, they evidently would have been able to also defend themselves against human predation, so there is no reason to expect that they would have been "easy pickings." When feeding, they had enough strength to use their long, sharp claws to tear apart tree branches; presumably their strength and formidable claws would be dangerous for hunters that attempted to attack them at close quarters. But fossilized evidence of humans hunting on ground sloth in White Sands National Park suggests that the slow-moving giant sloths were likely easy prey for early humans possibly hurling spears.

== Sources ==
- Cuvier, G. (1796). "Notice sur le squellette d'une très grande espèce de quadrupède inconnue jusqu'à présent, trouvé au Paraquay, et déposé au cabinet d'histoire naturelle de Madrid". Magasin encyopédique, ou Journal des Sciences, des Lettres et des Arts. 1: 303–310.; (2): 227–228.
- de Iuliis, G.; Cartelle, C. (1999). "A new giant megatheriine ground sloth (Mammalia: Xenarthra: Megatheriidae) from the late Blancan to early Irvingtonian of Florida". Zoological Journal of the Linnean Society. 127 (4): 495–515. doi:10.1111/j.1096-3642.1999.tb01383.x.
- Harrington, C.R. (1993): Yukon Beringia Interpretive Center – Jefferson's Ground Sloth. Retrieved 2008-JAN-24.
- Hogan, C.M. (2008): Cueva del Milodon, Megalithic Portal. Retrieved 2008-APR-13
- Kurtén, Björn and Anderson, Elaine (1980): Pleistocene Mammals of North America. Columbia University Press, New York. ISBN 0-231-03733-3
- McKenna, Malcolm C. & Bell, Susan K. (1997): Classification of Mammals Above the Species Level. Columbia University Press, New York. ISBN 0-231-11013-8
- Nowak, R.M. (1999): Walker's Mammals of the World (Vol. 2). Johns Hopkins University Press, London.
- White, J.L. (1993). "Indicators of locomotor habits in Xenarthrans: Evidence for locomotor heterogeneity among fossil sloths". Journal of Vertebrate Paleontology. 13 (2): 230–242. Bibcode:1993JVPal..13..230W. doi:10.1080/02724634.1993.10011502.
- White, J.L.; MacPhee, R.D.E. (2001). "The sloths of the West Indies: a systematic and phylogenetic review". In Woods, C.A.; Sergile, F.E. (eds.). Biogeography of the West Indies: Patterns and Perspectives. Boca Raton, London, New York, and Washington, D.C.: CRC Press. pp. 201–235. doi:10.1201/9781420039481-14. ISBN 978-0-8493-2001-9.
- Woodward, A.S. (1900). "On some remains of Grypotherium (Neomylodon) listai and associated mammals from a cavern near Consuelo Cove, Last Hope Inlet, Patagonia". Proceedings of the Zoological Society of London. 69 (1): 64–79. doi:10.1111/j.1096-3642.1890.tb01704.x.
