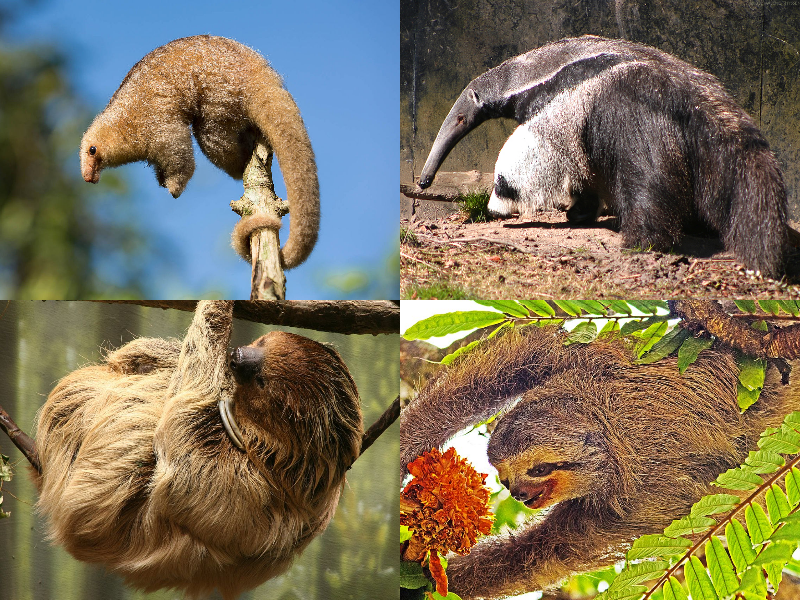
- Pilosa species of different families; from top-left, clockwise: Silky anteater (Cyclopes didactylus), giant anteater (Myrmecophaga tridactyla), pale-throated sloth (Bradypus tridactylus), Linnaeus's two-toed sloth (Choloepus didactylus)

Scientific classification
- Kingdom: Animalia
- Phylum: Chordata
- Class: Mammalia
- Infraclass: Placentalia
- Superorder: Xenarthra
- Order: Pilosa; Flower, 1883

Families
- Vermilingua; Cyclopedidae; Myrmecophagidae; Folivora; Bradypodidae; Choloepodidae; †Megalocnidae; †Megalonychidae; †Megatheriidae; †Mylodontidae; †Nothrotheriidae; †Scelidotheriidae
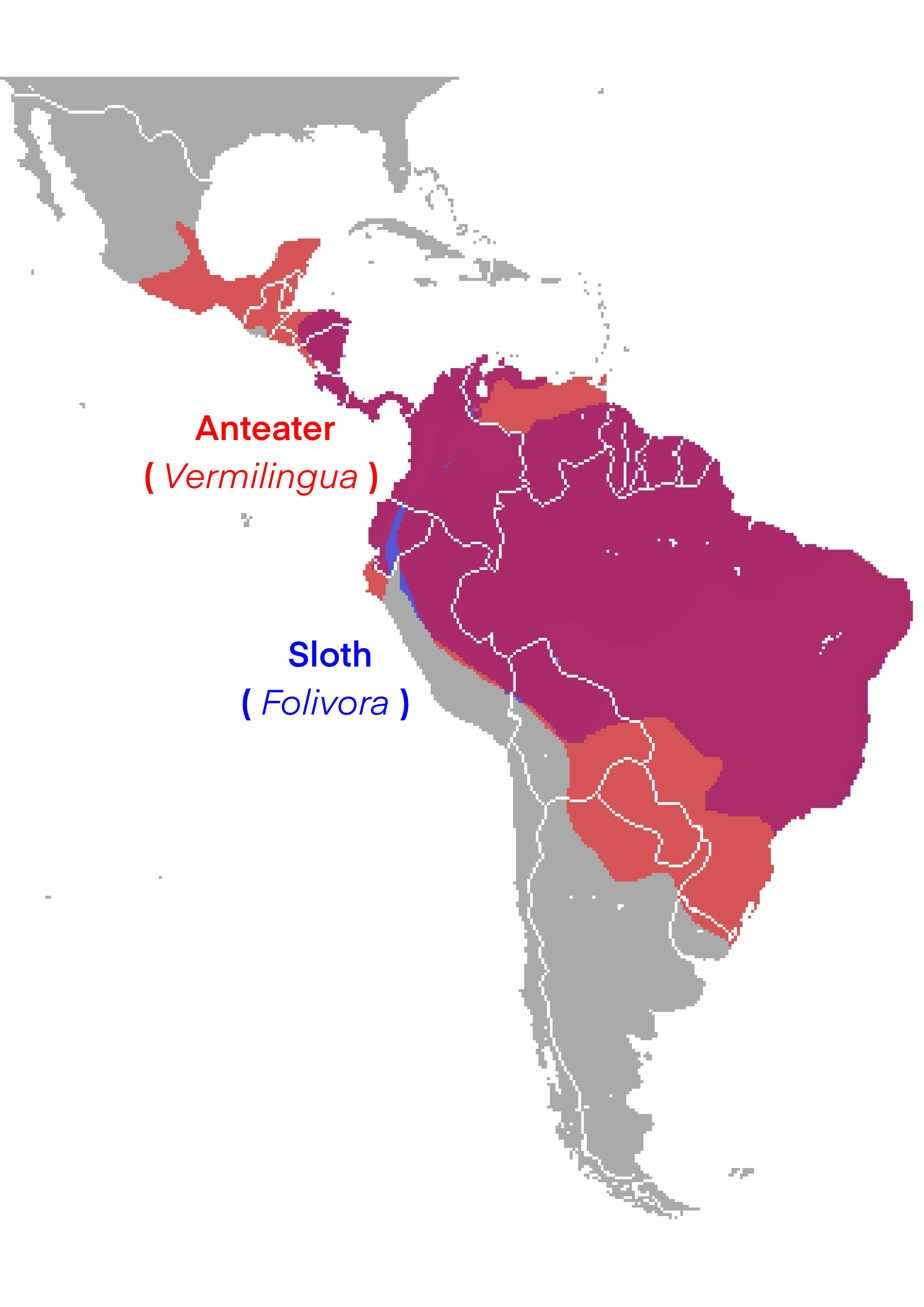
- Red: anteater, Blue: sloth, Purple: both sloth and anteater

= Pilosa =

Pilosans Temporal range: Paleocene - Holocene, 55.8–0 Ma

Order of mammals

Pilosa /paɪˈloʊsə/ is an order of xenarthran placental mammals, native to the Americas. They include anteaters and sloths (which include the extinct ground sloths). The name comes from the Latin word for "hairy".

== Origins and taxonomy ==
The biogeographic origins of the Pilosa are still unclear, but they can be traced back in South America as far as the early Paleogene (about 60 million years ago, only a short time after the end of the Mesozoic Era). The presence of these animals in Central America and their former presence in North America is a result of the Great American Interchange. A number of sloths were also formerly present on the Antilles, which they reached from South America by some combination of rafting or floating with the prevailing currents.

Together with the armadillos, which are in the order Cingulata, pilosans are part of the larger superorder Xenarthra, a defining characteristic of which is the presence of xenarthrals (extra formations between lumbar vertebrae). In the past, Pilosa was regarded as a suborder of the order Xenarthra, while some more recent classifications regard Pilosa as an order within the superorder Xenarthra. Earlier still, both armadillos and pilosans were classified together with pangolins and the aardvark as the order Edentata (meaning toothless, because the members do not have front incisor teeth or molars, or have poorly developed molars). Edentata was subsequently realized to be polyphyletic; it contained unrelated families and was thus invalid.

== Classification ==
=== Taxonomy ===
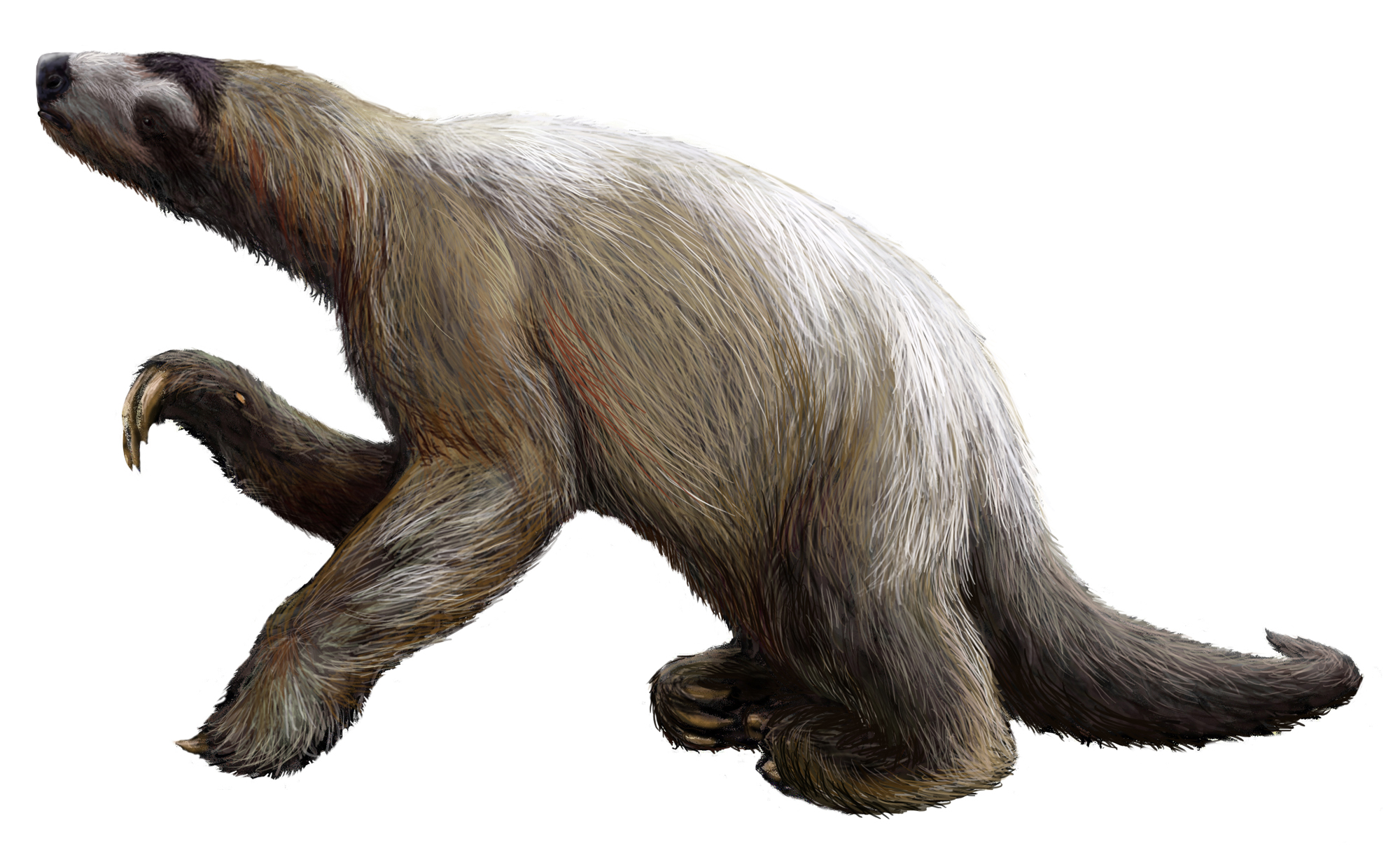
Restoration of the ground sloth Nothrotheriops

Order Pilosa

- Suborder Vermilingua Illiger 1811 em. Gray 1869 (Anteaters)
  - Family Cyclopedidae Pocock 1924 (Silky anteaters)
  - Family Myrmecophagidae Gray 1825
- Suborder Folivora Delsuc et al. 2001 (Sloths)
  - Superfamily †Megalocnoidea Delsuc et al. 2019
    - Family †Megalocnidae Delsuc et al. 2019 (megalocnid ground sloths of the Caribbean)
  - Suborder Obatrubida Delsuc et al. 2026 (Sloths)
    - Superfamily † Megaobatrubia Brown et al. 2026
      - Family † Megabubillita Brown et al. 2026
    - Superfamily Megabamo Brown 2026
      - Family Bradypodidae Gray 1821 (three-toed sloths)
      - Family †Megalonychidae Gervais 1855 (megalonychid ground sloths)
      - Family †Megatheriidae Gray 1821 (megatheriid ground sloths)
      - Family †Nothrotheriidae Ameghino 1920 (nothrotheriid ground sloths)
    - Superfamily Mylodontoidea Gill 1872
      - Family Choloepodidae Pocock 1924 (two-toed sloths)
      - Family †Mylodontidae Gill 1872 (mylodontid ground sloths)
      - Family †Scelidotheriidae Ameghino 1889 (scelidotheriid ground sloths)

=== Phylogeny ===
Major families within Pilosa

- Pilosa
  - Vermilingua
    - Cyclopedidae
    - Myrmecophagidae
  - Folivora
    - - † Megalocnoidea
        - † Megalocnidae
    - - Mylodontoidea
        - † Scelidotheriidae
        - - Choloepodidae
          - † Mylodontidae
      - Megatherioidea
        - - † Megalonychidae
          - Bradypodidae
        - - † Nothrotheriidae
          - † Megatheriidae

Cladogram of living Pilosa

- Pilosa
  - Vermilingua
    - Cyclopedidae
      - Cyclopes
        - - C. rufus
          - C. thomasi
        - - C. ida
          - - C. xinguensis
            - - C. didactylus
              - C. dorsalis
    - Myrmecophagidae
      - Myrmecophaga
        M. tridactyla
      - Tamandua
        - T. mexicana
        - T. tetradactyla
  - Folivora
    - Choloepodidae
      - Choloepus
        - C. didactylus
        - C. hoffmanni
    - Bradypodidae
      - Bradypus
        - B. torquatus
        - - B. pygmaeus
          - - B. tridactylus
            - B. variegatus
