= Cullinia =

Cullinia Temporal range: Late Miocene (Chasicoan-Huayquerian) ~11.6–6.8 Ma

Scientific classification
- Kingdom: Animalia
- Phylum: Chordata
- Class: Mammalia
- Order: †Litopterna
- Family: †Macraucheniidae
- Subfamily: †Macraucheniinae
- Genus: †Cullinia; Cabrera & Kraglievich, 1931
- Species: †C. levis

Binomial name
- †Cullinia levis Cabrera & Kraglievich, 1931

Extinct genus of litopterns

Cullinia is an extinct genus of litoptern, an order of South American native ungulates that included horse-like and camel-like animals such as Macrauchenia. It is only known from fragmentary remains. Cullinia levis is known from Chasicoan remains found in the Arroyo Chasicó Formation of Argentina, and remains from the Brazilian state of Acre and the Huayquerian Ituzaingó Formation have been assigned to Cullinia sp. .

== History and naming ==
Cullinia was described in 1931 by Cabrera and Kraglievich, from MLP 29-IX-178, a holotype containing several fragmentary remains including a mandible and a metatarsal. In 1995, Bond and López add to the holotype other remains from the upper dentition.

It was named from the Araucanian word "cullin", meaning "animal".

== Description ==
Cullinia was a slender, small Macraucheniidae. It had proportionally larger metapodials than Theosodon, and its first lower molar was absent.

== Classification ==
Below is a phylogenetic tree of the Macraucheniidae, based on the work of McGrath et al. 2018, showing the position of Cullinia.

- - Proadiantus excavatus
  - - Tricoelodus spp.
    - Macraucheniidae
      - Polymorphis lechei
      - - - Pternoconius spp.
          - Cramauchenia normalis
          - - - Coniopternium
              - Llullataruca shockeyi
            - - - Theosodon spp.
                - Theosodon arozquetai
              - Macraucheniinae
                - Scalabrinitherium bravardi
                - - - Huayqueriana cristata
                    - Huayqueriana cf. cristata
                  - - - Oxyodontherium zeballosi
                      - - Paranauchenia hystata
                        - Paranauchenia denticulata
                    - - Cullinia levis
                      - - - Promacrauchenia calchaquiorum
                          - Promacrauchenia antiqua
                        - - - Windhausenia delacroixi
                            - Xenorhinotherium bahiense
                          - - Macraucheniopsis ensenadensis
                            - Macrauchenia patachonica

== Palaeoecology ==
The Arroyo Chasicó formation was, in the Miocene, on the tip of a peninsula bordered by the Paranaense Sea. Cullinia would have lived alongside various genera of Cingulata, including the last horned armadillo Epipeltephilus, the dasypodids Chasicotatus, the chlamyphorid Vetelia, the euphractine Proeuphractus, the pampathere Kraglievichia, and the glyptodont Kelenkura. Other xenarthrans includes several genera of ground sloths, such as the mylodontid Octomylodon, the megalonychid Protomegalonyx, the nothrotheriids Xyophorus and Chasicobradys, and the megatheriid Anisodontherium. Several genera of rodents were recovered from the formation, such as the earliest genera of tuco-tucos, maras and cavioids such as Cardiomys, Procardiomys and Cardiatherium, octodontids such as Chasicomys and Chasichimys, the echimyids Pattersomys, the plain viscacha Lagostomus telenkechanum and its relative Prolagostomus, and the large-sized dinomyid Carlesia. Meridiungulates were also present in the formation, with the fellow litoptern genera such as the fellow macraucheniid Paranauchenia, and the proterotheriid Neobrachytherium, while notoungulates were represented by genera such as the large-sized late surviving homalodotheriid Chasicotherium, the toxodontid Paratrigodon, the interatheriid Protypotherium, the mesotheriid Typotheriopsis, and the hegetotheriids Paedotherium, Pseudohegetotherium and Hemihegetotherium. The largest predators were the sparassodonts Pseudolycopsis cabrerai and Lycopsis viverensis, and the small terror bird Psilopterus.
