= Pternoconius =

Pternoconius Temporal range: Late Oligocene-Early Miocene (Deseadan-Colhuehuapian) 27.0–17.5 Ma

Scientific classification
- Kingdom: Animalia
- Phylum: Chordata
- Class: Mammalia
- Order: †Litopterna
- Family: †Macraucheniidae
- Subfamily: †Cramaucheniinae
- Genus: †Pternoconius; Cifelli and Soria 1983

Type species
- †Pternoconius polymorphoides Cifelli and Soria 1983

Species
- P. tournoueri Soria and Hoffstetter 1985; P. bondi L. Cheme-Arriaga et al. 2016; P. polymorphoides Cifelli and Soria 1983

Extinct genus of litopterns

Pternoconius is an extinct genus of macraucheniid litoptern from the Late Oligocene and Early Miocene of Argentina. Fossils of this genus have been found in the Sarmiento Formation of Argentina.

== Etymology ==
The genus name, Pternoconius, is a near-anagram of the closely related genus Coniopternium. The species name refers to the similarity of the Eocene genus Polymorphis.

== Species ==
=== Pternoconius tournoueri ===
In 1985, fossils found in the Early Miocene Colhué Huapí Member of the Sarmiento Formation were assigned to the genus under the name Pternoconius tournoueri, consisting of a nearly complete hemimandible.

=== Pternoconius bondi ===
In 2016 a new species of macraucheniid litoptern was described coming from the Bajada del Diablo locality in the Sarmiento Formation, consisting of the anterior portion of the skull with the maxillary region, some fragments of nasal bones, a small portion of the left zygomatic process, and most of the upper dentition (i.e., left P2–M3, right C, and right P1–M3). The species was named after Mariano Bond, in recognition of his contributions to the knowledge of South American native ungulates.

== Classification ==
Pternoconius is a member of the subfamily Cramaucheniinae within the family Macraucheniidae. Phylogenetic analyses of the family in 2014 and 2018 found that Cramaucheniinae is a paraphyletic group and that Theosodon is a sister clade to the subfamily Macraucheniinae, the least primitive members of the family.

- - Proadiantus
  - - Tricoelodus
    - - Polymorphis
      - - Pternoconius
        - Coniopternium
        - Cramauchenia
        - - Theosodon
          - - Scalabrinitherium
            - - Oxyodontherium
              - - Huayqueriana
                - - - Paranauchenia denticulata
                    - Paranauchenia hystatus
                  - - Cullinia
                    - - Promacrauchenia
                      - - Windhausenia
                        - Xenorhinotherium
                        - - Macraucheniopsis
                          - Macrauchenia

The results of McGrath et al. 2018 are shown below.

- - Proadiantus excavatus
  - - Tricoelodus spp.
    - Macraucheniidae
      - Polymorphis lechei
      - - - Pternoconius spp.
          - Cramauchenia normalis
          - - - Coniopternium
              - Llullataruca shockeyi
            - - - Theosodon spp.
                - Theosodon arozquetai
              - Macraucheniinae
                - Scalabrinitherium bravardi
                - - - Huayqueriana cristata
                    - Huayqueriana cf. cristata
                  - - - Oxyodontherium zeballosi
                      - - Paranauchenia hystata
                        - Paranauchenia denticulata
                    - - Cullinia levis
                      - - - Promacrauchenia calchaquiorum
                          - Promacrauchenia antiqua
                        - - - Windhausenia delacroixi
                            - Xenorhinotherium bahiense
                          - - Macraucheniopsis ensenadensis
                            - Macrauchenia patachonica
