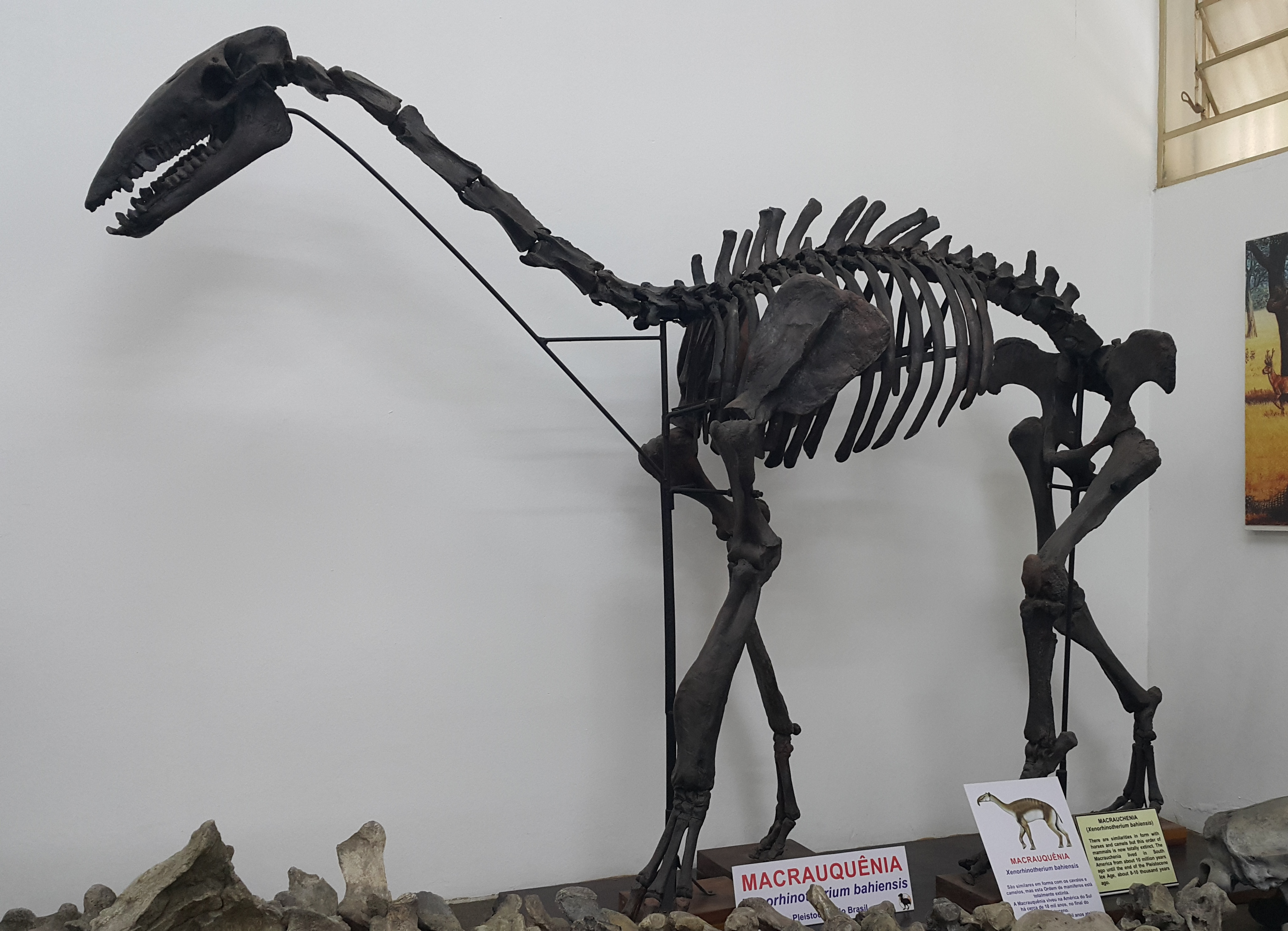
- Mounted skeleton of X. bahiense

Scientific classification
- Kingdom: Animalia
- Phylum: Chordata
- Class: Mammalia
- Order: †Litopterna
- Family: †Macraucheniidae
- Subfamily: †Macraucheniinae
- Genus: †Xenorhinotherium; Cartelle & Lessa, 1988
- Species: †X. bahiense

Binomial name
- †Xenorhinotherium bahiense Cartelle & Lessa, 1988
- Map showing the distribution of Macrauchenia in red, and Xenorhinotherium in yellow, inferred from fossil finds

= Xenorhinotherium =

Xenorhinotherium Temporal range: Late Pleistocene-Holocene (Ensenadan-Lujanian) Possible late Holocene records

Extinct genus of litopterns

Xenorhinotherium is an extinct genus of macraucheniine macraucheniids, native to northern South America during the Pleistocene and Holocene epoch, closely related to Macrauchenia of Patagonia. The type species is X. bahiense.

== Taxonomy ==
Some authors have proposed that the genus Xenorhinotherium a synonym of Macrauchenia, though this has not been widely accepted. The name Xenorhinotherium means "Strange-Nosed Beast" and bahiense refers to the Brazilian state of Bahia, where the first fossils were found.

Xenorhinotherium was a rather derived representative of the Macraucheniidae, a group of litopterns with camel-like appearances. Probably derived from lower Miocene forms such as Cramauchenia and Theosodon, this animal probably closely related to the large macraucheniids of the Pliocene and Pleistocene, such as Macrauchenia and Windhausenia.

Below is a phylogenetic tree of the Macraucheniidae, based on the work of McGrath et al. 2018, showing the position of Xenorhinotherium.

- - Proadiantus excavatus
  - - Tricoelodus spp.
    - Macraucheniidae
      - Polymorphis lechei
      - - - Pternoconius spp.
          - Cramauchenia normalis
          - - - Coniopternium
              - Llullataruca shockeyi
            - - - Theosodon spp.
                - Theosodon arozquetai
              - Macraucheniinae
                - Scalabrinitherium bravardi
                - - - Huayqueriana cristata
                    - Huayqueriana cf. cristata
                  - - - Oxyodontherium zeballosi
                      - - Paranauchenia hystata
                        - Paranauchenia denticulata
                    - - Cullinia levis
                      - - - Promacrauchenia calchaquiorum
                          - Promacrauchenia antiqua
                        - - - Windhausenia delacroixi
                            - Xenorhinotherium bahiense
                          - - Macraucheniopsis ensenadensis
                            - Macrauchenia patachonica

== Characteristics ==
Life restoration

X. bahiense was a megafaunal herbivore that probably looked very much like Macrauchenia, weighing about 940 kg (2,070 lb). In life, X. bahiense would have vaguely resembled a tall, humpless camel with three toes on each foot and either a saiga-like proboscis or a moose-like nose. Pictographs from the Serranía de La Lindosa rock formation of Guaviare, Colombia, show what might possibly be Xenorhinotherium with three toes and a trunk, though the claims are highly controversial, and it is uncertain whether they even date to the last Ice Age.

Paired δ^{13}C and δ^{18}O measurements from fossils in the Brazilian Intertropical Region indicate that X. bahiense was primarily a browser. These findings are supported by its hypsodonty index. However, results derived from the dental microwear of X. bahiense contradict these findings and instead recover the species as a grazer because of the high number of scratches on its tooth enamel that typically indicate a highly abrasive, grass-based diet. Additionally, X. bahiense inhabited semi-arid tropical environments, in contrast to its close relative Macrauchenia patachonica, which inhabited subtropical to temperate environments that were more arid than those which X. bahiense lived in.

== Distribution ==
Fossils of Xenorhinotherium, dating from the Late Pleistocene to the Early Holocene, have been found in the states of Bahia, the Jandaíra Formation of Rio Grande do Norte, and Minas Gerais in modern Brazil, and also in Venezuela, in the localities of Muaco, Taima-Taima and Cuenca del Lago.

Though not known from other countries, computer modelling suggests that the habitat in the western Andean slopes of Colombia, Ecuador, and Peru would have been suitable for this animal, particularly in areas that have not been extensively excavated yet.

A 2025 study suggested that Xenorhinotherium survivied until the Holocene around 3,493–4,217 years cal. Before Present (BP), based on a radiocarbon dated specimen found in Brazil.

== Bibliography ==
- Morón, Camilo (January 2015). "Panorama geológico, paleontológico, arqueológico, histórico y mitológico del estado Falcón" [Geological panorama, paleontology, archeology, history and mythology in the State of Falcon, Venezuela]. Boletín Antropológico (in Spanish). 89 (1).
- Socorro, Orangel Antonio Aguilera (2006). Tesoros paleontológicos de Venezuela: el cuaternario del Estado Falcón [Paleontological treasures of Venezuela: the quaternary of the Falcón State] (in Spanish). Ministerio de la Cultura. ISBN 978-980-12-1379-6.
