= Promacrauchenia =

Promacrauchenia Temporal range: Late Miocene-Pliocene (Huayquerian-Uquian) ~6.8–3.0 Ma

Scientific classification
- Kingdom: Animalia
- Phylum: Chordata
- Class: Mammalia
- Order: †Litopterna
- Family: †Macraucheniidae
- Subfamily: †Macraucheniinae
- Genus: †Promacrauchenia; Ameghino, 1904

Type species
- †Promacrauchenia antiqua Ameghino, (1889)

Other species
- †P. calchaquiorum Rovereto, 1914

Synonyms
- Macrauchenia antiqua Ameghino 1889

Extinct genus of litopterns

Promacrauchenia is an extinct genus of macraucheniids that lived during the Late Miocene to Late Pliocene epochs of what is now Argentina and Bolivia. It belongs to the subfamily Macraucheniinae, which also includes Huayqueriana, Macrauchenia, and Xenorhinotherium. Fossils of this genus have been found in the Ituzaingó, Andalhuala, and Cerro Azul Formations of Argentina.

== Classification ==
The genus Promacrauchenia was first described by Florentino Ameghino in 1904, on the basis of fossils found in Patagonia in lower Pliocene deposits and which Ameghino himself, years earlier, had described as a species of Macrauchenia, as M. antiqua . In addition to the type species, Promacrauchenia antiqua, other species have been assigned to this genus: P. calchaquiorum, P. chapadmalense, P. ensenadense, P. kraglievichi and P. yepesi.

Promacrauchenia was a member of the Macraucheniidae, a group of litopterns whose evolution led to the development of camel-like forms with strange nasal bones. Promacrauchenia, in particular, was a specialized macraucheniid, perhaps directly ancestral to genera such as Macrauchenia and Windhausenia.

The following cladogram of the Macraucheniidae is based on McGrath et al. 2018, showing the position of Promacrauchenia.

- - Proadiantus excavatus
  - - Tricoelodus spp.
    - Macraucheniidae
      - Polymorphis lechei
      - - - Pternoconius spp.
          - Cramauchenia normalis
          - - - Coniopternium
              - Llullataruca shockeyi
            - - - Theosodon spp.
                - Theosodon arozquetai
              - Macraucheniinae
                - Scalabrinitherium bravardi
                - - - Huayqueriana cristata
                    - Huayqueriana cf. cristata
                  - - - Oxyodontherium zeballosi
                      - - Paranauchenia hystata
                        - Paranauchenia denticulata
                    - - Cullinia levis
                      - - - Promacrauchenia calchaquiorum
                          - Promacrauchenia antiqua
                        - - - Windhausenia delacroixi
                            - Xenorhinotherium bahiense
                          - - Macraucheniopsis ensenadensis
                            - Macrauchenia patachonica
