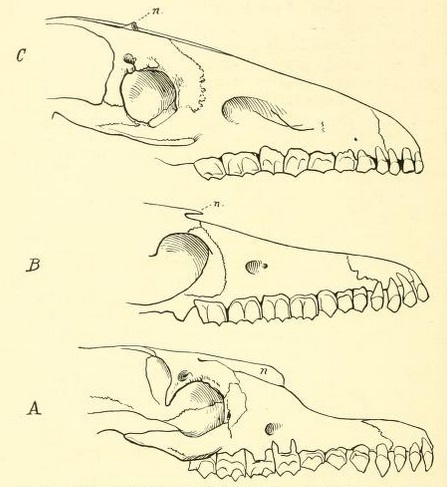
- Skulls of Macraucheniidae. A: Theosodon. B: Scalabrinitherium. C: Macrauchenia

Scientific classification
- Kingdom: Animalia
- Phylum: Chordata
- Class: Mammalia
- Order: †Litopterna
- Family: †Macraucheniidae
- Subfamily: †Macraucheniinae
- Genus: †Scalabrinitherium; Ameghino 1883

Type species
- †Scalabrinitherium bravardi

Species
- S. bravardi; S. rothii

Synonyms
- Scalibrinitherium (Ameghino, 1889)

= Scalabrinitherium =

Scalabrinitherium Temporal range: Late Miocene (Huayquerian) ~9.0–7.246 Ma

Extinct genus of litopterns

Scalabrinitherium is an extinct genus of mammals of the family Macraucheniidae. Fossils of this animal were found among the fossils of prehistoric xenarthrans in the Ituzaingó Formation of Argentina.

== Description ==
This animal was rather similar to a llama with a slightly heavy build; the skull was long and low, the front teeth were slightly spatulate, and the nasal aperture set far back. It is possible that there was a strong prehensile lip or a short proboscis. The shortening of the nasal aperture was not as extreme as that of later macrauchenids. The orbit too had not fully moved behind the teeth, as in the more derived members of the clade. The height of this animal must have exceeded two meters; the limbs were slender but relatively heavy, three-toed. Scalabrinitherium had brachyodont teeth, and upper molars less derived than those of Macrauchenia.

== Classification ==
The first paleontologist to describe the fossils of this animal was Bravard, who in 1858 attributed the fossils to a presumed South American species of the perissodactyl Palaeotherium, P. paranense. It was the Argentinean paleontologist Florentino Ameghino, in 1883, who described the genus Scalabrinitherium for this species, also describing the new species S. bravardi in the fauna of Entre Rios which dates to the Late Miocene. Later, in 1885, the same author described an additional species, S. rothii. Ameghino had a tendency to misspell the names of his taxa, which is the case with Scalabrinitherium, which has been spelled as Scalibrinitherium in older literature.

Scalabrinitherium was a rather derived representative of the Macraucheniidae, a group of litopterns with a camel-like appearance. Probably derived from lower Miocene forms such as Cramauchenia and Theosodon, this animal probably gave rise to the large macraucheniids of the Pliocene and Pleistocene, such as Macrauchenia and Xenorhinotherium.

Cladogram based in the phylogenetic analysis published by Schmidt et al., 2014, showing the position of Scalabrinitherium:

- - Proadiantus
  - - Tricoelodus
    - - Polymorphis
      - - Pternoconius
        - Coniopternium
        - Cramauchenia
        - - Theosodon
          - - Macraucheniinae
              - Scalabrinitherium
              - - Oxyodontherium
                - - Huayqueriana
                  - - - Paranauchenia denticulata
                      - Paranauchenia hystatus
                    - - Cullinia
                      - - Promacrauchenia
                        - - Windhausenia
                          - Xenorhinotherium
                          - - Macraucheniopsis
                            - Macrauchenia

== Paleoenvironment ==
Fossils of Scalabrinitherium have been recovered from the Ituzaingó Formation of Entre Rios, Argentina, which preserves vast tidal flats similar to those in the modern day Amazon and a warm climate. Large, herbivorous notoungulate mammals in the Ituzaingó Formation were widespread, including the toxodontids Xotodon and Adinotherium, and fellow litopterns such as Brachytherium, Cullinia, Diadiaphorus, Neobrachytherium, Oxyodontherium, Paranauchenia, Promacrauchenia, and Proterotherium. Large, armored glyptodonts like Palaehoplophorus, Eleutherocercus, and Plohophorus lived in the area as well as other cingulates like the pampatheres Kraglievichia and Scirrotherium, and the dasypodid Dasypus neogaeus. Carnivores included the phorusrhacids Devincenzia and Andalgalornis and sparassodonts, with giant crocodilians like Gryposuchus and Mourasuchus in the freshwater. Bamboos, coconut palms, and other palms were also present.
