= Macraucheniopsis =

Macraucheniopsis Temporal range: Middle Pleistocene-Late Pleistocene (Ensenadan-Lujanian) ~0.781–0.0117 Ma

Scientific classification
- Domain: Eukaryota
- Kingdom: Animalia
- Phylum: Chordata
- Class: Mammalia
- Order: †Litopterna
- Family: †Macraucheniidae
- Subfamily: †Macraucheniinae
- Genus: †Macraucheniopsis; Paula Couto, 1945
- Species: †M. ensenadensis

Binomial name
- †Macraucheniopsis ensenadensis Ameghino (1888)

Synonyms
- Promacrauchenia ensenadense Ameghino 1888

Extinct genus of litopterns

Macraucheniopsis is an extinct genus of litoptern mammal belonging to the family Macraucheniidae from the Middle to Late Pleistocene of Argentina. It, along with Macrauchenia, Neolicaphrium, and Xenorhinotherium were among the youngest known genera of litopterns.

== Classification ==
Cladogram showing the taxonomic relationships of Macraucheniopsis:

- - Proadiantus
  - - Tricoelodus
    - - Polymorphis
      - - Pternoconius
        - Coniopternium
        - Cramauchenia
        - - Theosodon
          - - Macraucheniinae
              - Scalabrinitherium
              - - Oxyodontherium
                - - Huayqueriana
                  - - - Paranauchenia denticulata
                      - Paranauchenia hystatus
                    - - Cullinia
                      - - Promacrauchenia
                        - - Windhausenia
                          - Xenorhinotherium
                          - - Macraucheniopsis
                            - Macrauchenia
