= Windhausenia =

Windhausenia Temporal range: Late Pliocene-Early Pleistocene (Chapadmalalan-Uquian) ~3–2.5 Ma

Scientific classification
- Kingdom: Animalia
- Phylum: Chordata
- Class: Mammalia
- Infraclass: Placentalia
- Order: †Litopterna
- Family: †Macraucheniidae
- Subfamily: †Macraucheniinae
- Genus: †Windhausenia; Kraglievich, 1930
- Species: †W. delacroixi

Binomial name
- †Windhausenia delacroixi Kraglievich, 1930

Extinct genus of litoptern South American ungulate

Windhausenia is an extinct genus of mammals belonging to the family Macraucheniidae and the order Litopterna. While it reached the size of its better known relative Macrauchenia, its constitution was lighter. Remains from the genus have been uncovered in Argentina.

Windhausenia fossils were only found in the middle layers of the Uquía Formation. The genus was described in 1930 by Kraglievich, who considered it more derived than Promacrauchenia, but less than Macrauchenia.

The genus survived the Great American Interchange. It had to compete with more derived relatives such as Macrauchenia, and may have occupied a specialised ecological niche to avoid competition. Its remains are found in subtropical areas, while other genera were found in tropical and temperate environment. As fossils of this genus are often found in association with aeolian deposits, corresponding with arid and semiarid environments, it is possible it occupied environments more similar to those of modern camels than its relative Macrauchenia.

== Classification ==
Cladogram based in the phylogenetic analysis published by Schmidt et al., 2014, showing the position of Windhausenia:

- - Proadiantus
  - - Tricoelodus
    - - Polymorphis
      - - Pternoconius
        - Coniopternium
        - Cramauchenia
        - - Theosodon
          - - Macraucheniinae
              - Scalabrinitherium
              - - Oxyodontherium
                - - Huayqueriana
                  - - - Paranauchenia denticulata
                      - Paranauchenia hystatus
                    - - Cullinia
                      - - Promacrauchenia
                        - - Windhausenia
                          - Xenorhinotherium
                          - - Macraucheniopsis
                            - Macrauchenia
