= Paranauchenia =

Paranauchenia Temporal range: Late Miocene (Huayquerian) ~9.0–6.8 Ma

Scientific classification
- Kingdom: Animalia
- Phylum: Chordata
- Class: Mammalia
- Order: †Litopterna
- Family: †Macraucheniidae
- Subfamily: †Macraucheniinae
- Genus: †Paranauchenia; Ameghino, 1904

Type species
- †Paranauchenia denticulata Ameghino, 1904

Extinct genus of litopterns

Paranauchenia is an extinct genus of South American litopterns belonging to the family Macraucheniidae. It is known only from fossil finds in Argentina. It possessed three toes and long limbs. The species Paranauchenia denticulata lived in the Miocene epoch in Argentina. Fossils have been found in the Arroyo Chasicó and Ituzaingó Formations of Argentina.

== Classification ==
Cladogram based in the phylogenetic analysis published by Schmidt et al., 2014, showing the position of Paranauchenia:

- - Proadiantus
  - - Tricoelodus
    - - Polymorphis
      - - Pternoconius
        - Coniopternium
        - Cramauchenia
        - - Theosodon
          - - Macraucheniinae
              - Scalabrinitherium
              - - Oxyodontherium
                - - Huayqueriana
                  - - - Paranauchenia denticulata
                      - Paranauchenia hystatus
                    - - Cullinia
                      - - Promacrauchenia
                        - - Windhausenia
                          - Xenorhinotherium
                          - - Macraucheniopsis
                            - Macrauchenia
