= Huayqueriana =

Huayqueriana Temporal range: Late Miocene (Huayquerian) ~9–7 Ma

Scientific classification
- Domain: Eukaryota
- Kingdom: Animalia
- Phylum: Chordata
- Class: Mammalia
- Order: †Litopterna
- Family: †Macraucheniidae
- Subfamily: †Macraucheniinae
- Genus: †Huayqueriana; Rovereto 1914
- Species: †H. cristata

Binomial name
- †Huayqueriana cristata Rovereto 1914

Synonyms
- Macrauchenidia latidens Cabrera 1939; Huayqueria cristata Riggs and Patterson 1939; Promacrauchenia (Huayqueriana) cristata Kraglievich 1934

Extinct genus of litopterns

Huayqueriana is an extinct genus of South American litoptern, related to Macrauchenia, and belonging to the same family, Macraucheniidae. It was formerly known as Macrauchenidia latidens, described in 1939 by Cabrera, but redefined as Huayqueriana in 2016 based on the earlier name convention of Rovereto 1914. The genus is named after the Huayquerías Formation and the eponymous Huayquerian South American land mammal age defined at the formation.

== Classification ==
Cladogram based in the phylogenetic analysis published by Schmidt et al., 2014, showing the position of Huayqueriana:

- - Proadiantus
  - - Tricoelodus
    - - Polymorphis
      - - Pternoconius
        - Coniopternium
        - Cramauchenia
        - - Theosodon
          - - Macraucheniinae
              - Scalabrinitherium
              - - Oxyodontherium
                - - Huayqueriana
                  - - - Paranauchenia denticulata
                      - Paranauchenia hystatus
                    - - Cullinia
                      - - Promacrauchenia
                        - - Windhausenia
                          - Xenorhinotherium
                          - - Macraucheniopsis
                            - Macrauchenia
