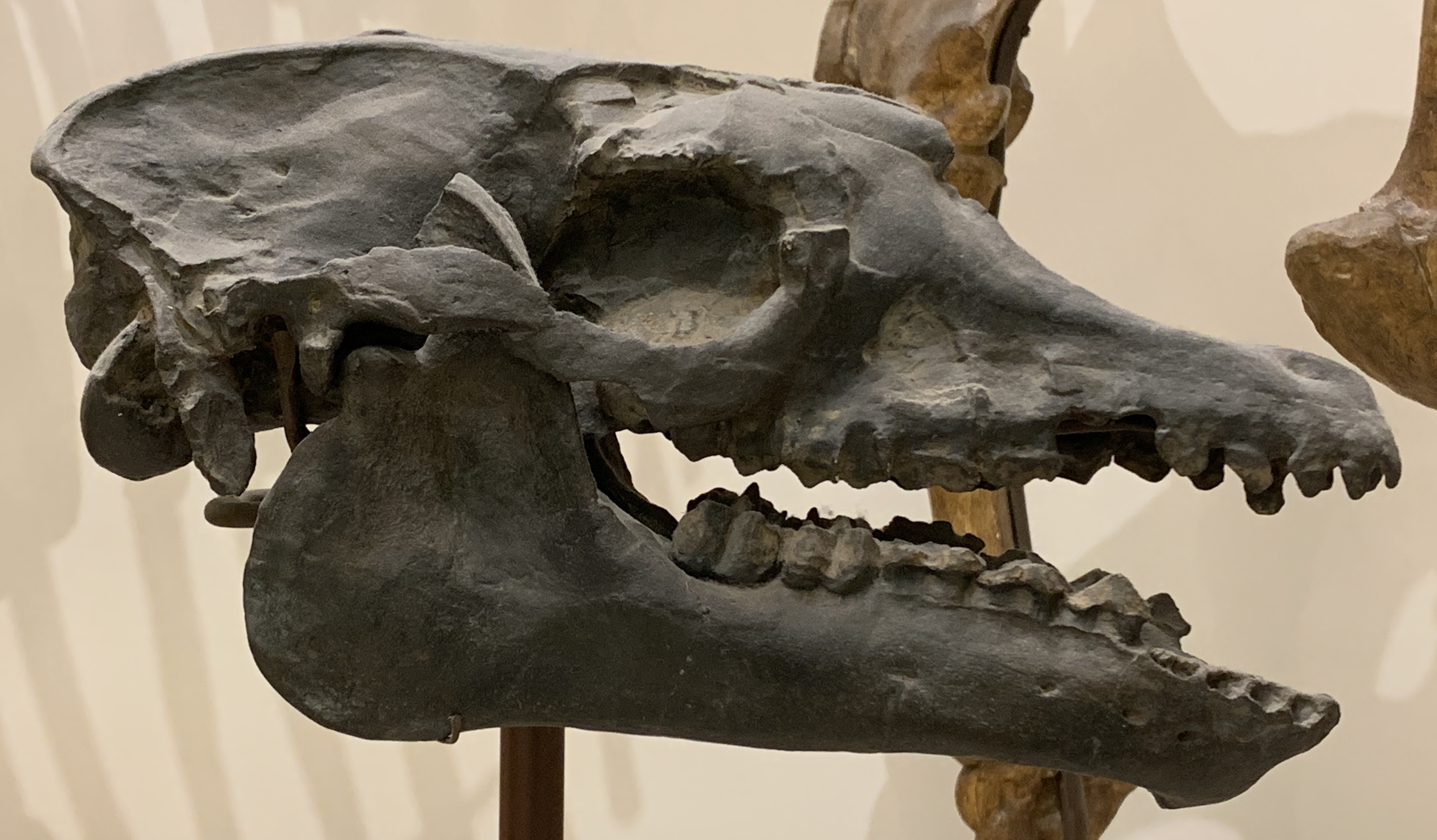
- Theosodon patagonicum skull cast of a specimen from Patagonia, Argentina.
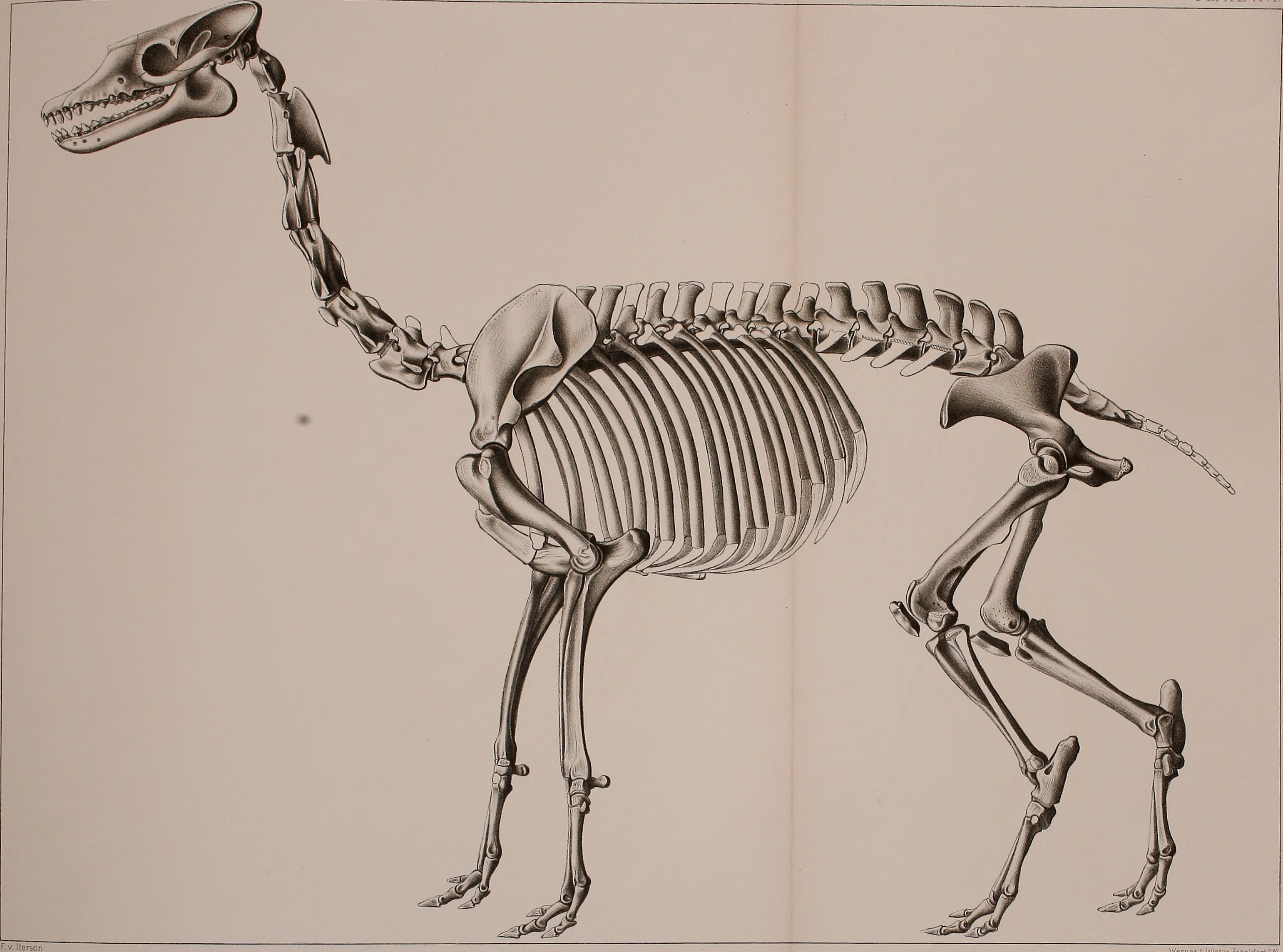
- T. garretorum, 1901 skeleton illustration

Scientific classification
- Domain: Eukaryota
- Kingdom: Animalia
- Phylum: Chordata
- Class: Mammalia
- Order: †Litopterna
- Family: †Macraucheniidae
- Subfamily: †Cramaucheniinae
- Genus: †Theosodon; Ameghino, 1887

Type species
- †Theosodon lydekkeri Ameghino, 1887

Species
- T. arozquetai McGrath et al., 2018; T. fontanae Ameghino, 1891; T. garretorum Scott, 1910; T. gracilis Ameghino, 1891; T. karaikensis Ameghino, 1904; T. lallemanti Mercerat, 1891; T. lydekkeri Ameghino, 1887; T. patagonicum (Ameghino, 1891)

Synonyms
- Pseudocoelosoma Ameghino, 1891

= Theosodon =

Theosodon Temporal range: Early-Mid Miocene (Colhuehuapian-Laventan) 21.0–11.8 Ma

Extinct genus of litopterns

Theosodon is an extinct genus of litoptern mammal from the Early to Middle Miocene of South America.

== Description ==
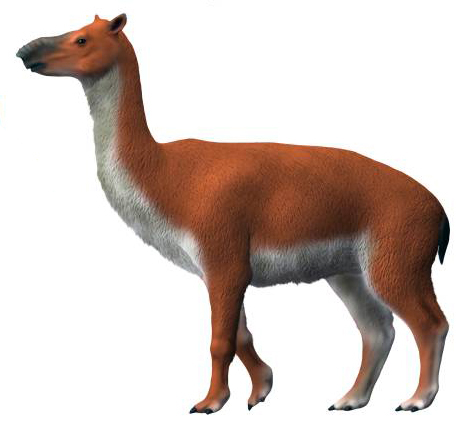
Reconstruction

Theosodon was long-legged with a long neck resembling modern llamas or guanacos. It was large for a litoptern, reaching up to 2 metres (6.6 ft) in length and weighing up to 125–170 kilograms (276–375 lb).

It had a long neck and tapir-like, three-toed feet, and like other litopterns and modern horses, tapirs and rhinos, it bore its weight on its middle toes.

Extraordinarily, rather than having nostrils at the front of its head, Theosodon had its nostrils on the top of its snout, halfway between the forehead and the tip of the snout, and its nostrils pointed upwards rather than forwards, possibly as an adaptation for browsing on prickly vegetation.

== History and species ==
Theosodon has been known since the 19th century, and by 1910 seven species had been described within the genus, all from the early Miocene Santa Cruz Formation in Argentina. The name Theosodon means "god tooth". The first fossils were only dental remains, but it is unknown why this name was given. Though seven species had originally been described, the exact number of discovered species remains uncertain as it varies between different authors. There are either ten or seven species, and in 2014 Schmidt and Ferrero put forward that the genus needed a full taxonomic revision due to this issue.

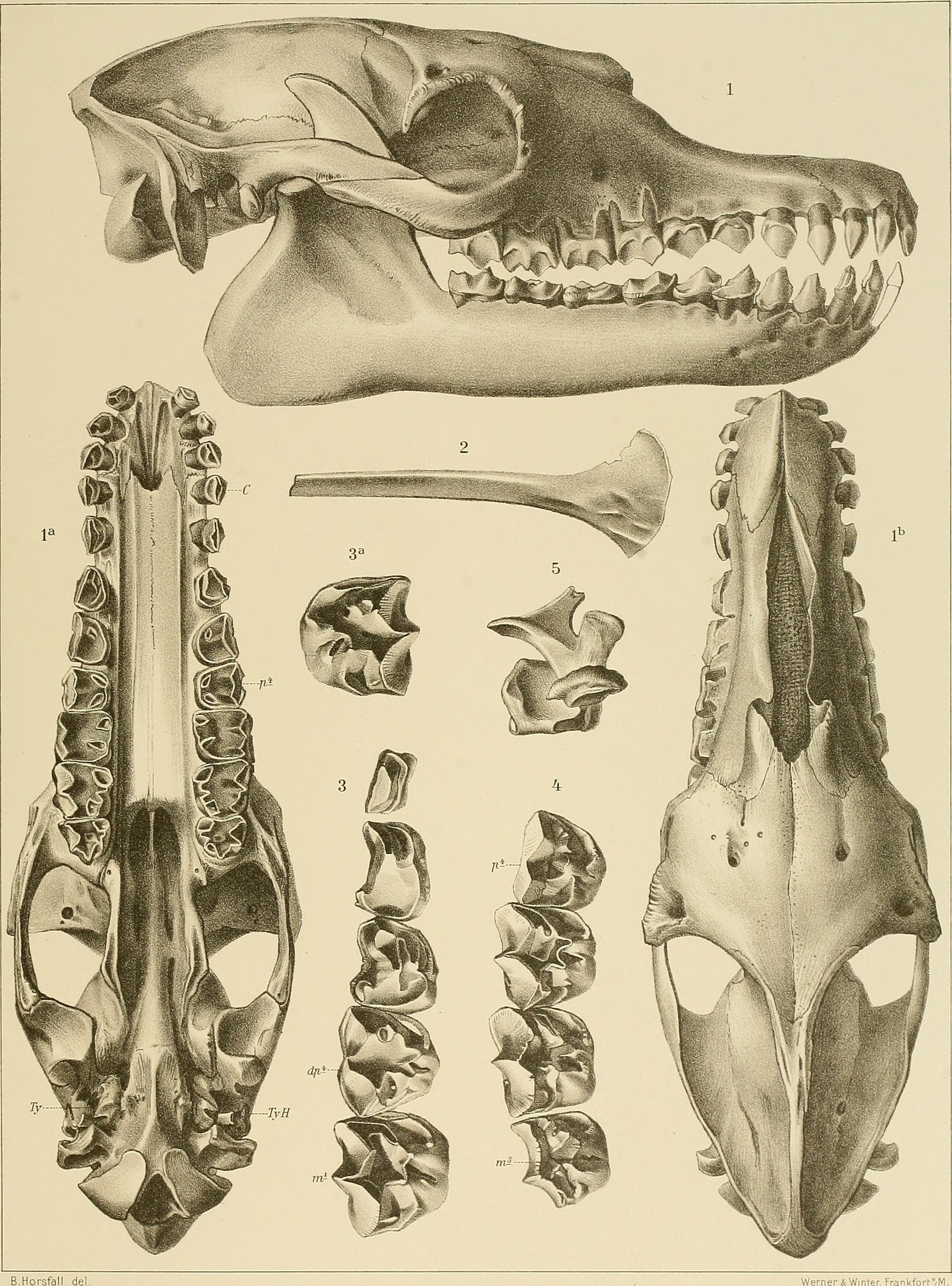
T. garretorum.

=== "Theosodon" hystatus ===
In 1931, fossils found in the late Miocene Arroyo Chasicó Formation were assigned to the genus under the name Theosodon hystatus. This was questioned in 1995, and in 2014 it was moved to the genus Paranauchenia due to similarities to the species Paranauchenia denticulata. This move was supported by phylogenetic analysis that showed the two species formed monophyletic clade.

=== "Theosodon" arozquetai ===
In 2018 a new species of macraucheniid litoptern was described based on the partial remains of a skull and two metapodials. A phylogenetic analysis tentatively linked the species to Theosodon as a sister clade and it was named Theosodon arozquetai pending revision. Its body mass was estimated to be somewhere from 80.8 to 116.2 kilograms (178 to 256 lb). It dated to the middle Miocene, about 13 million years ago, somewhat later than most other Theosodon species.

== Classification ==
Theosodon is in the subfamily Cramaucheniinae within the family Macraucheniidae. A phylogenetic analysis of the family in 2014 found that Cramaucheniinae is a paraphyletic group, and that Theosodon is a sister clade to the subfamily Macraucheniinae, the least primitive of the members of Cramaucheniinae.

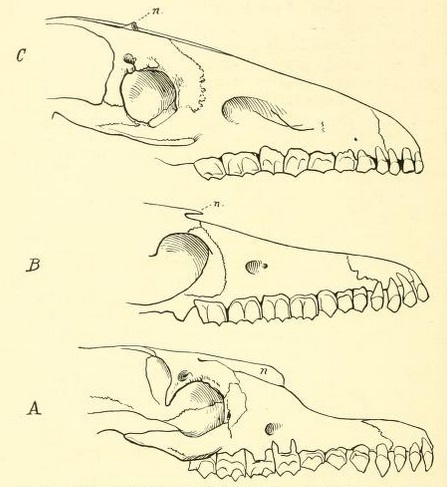
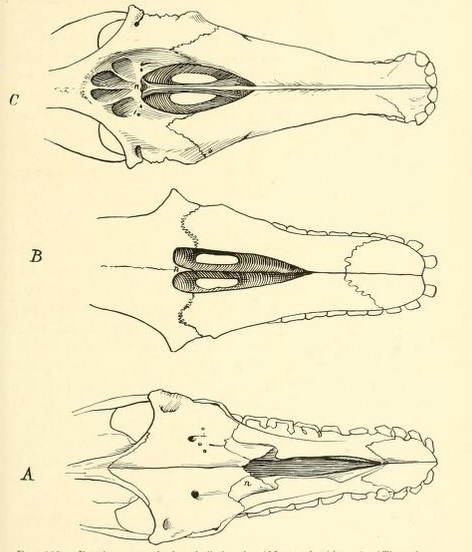
Skulls of Macraucheniidae. A: Theosodon. B: Scalabrinitherium. C: Macrauchenia. n: nasal bones.

- - Proadiantus
  - - Tricoelodus
    - - Polymorphis
      - - Pternoconius
        - Coniopternium
        - Cramauchenia
        - - Theosodon
          - - Scalabrinitherium
            - - Oxyodontherium
              - - Huayqueriana
                - - - Paranauchenia denticulata
                    - Paranauchenia hystatus
                  - - Cullinia
                    - - Promacrauchenia
                      - - Windhausenia
                        - Xenorhinotherium
                        - - Macraucheniopsis
                          - Macrauchenia

== Paleobiology ==
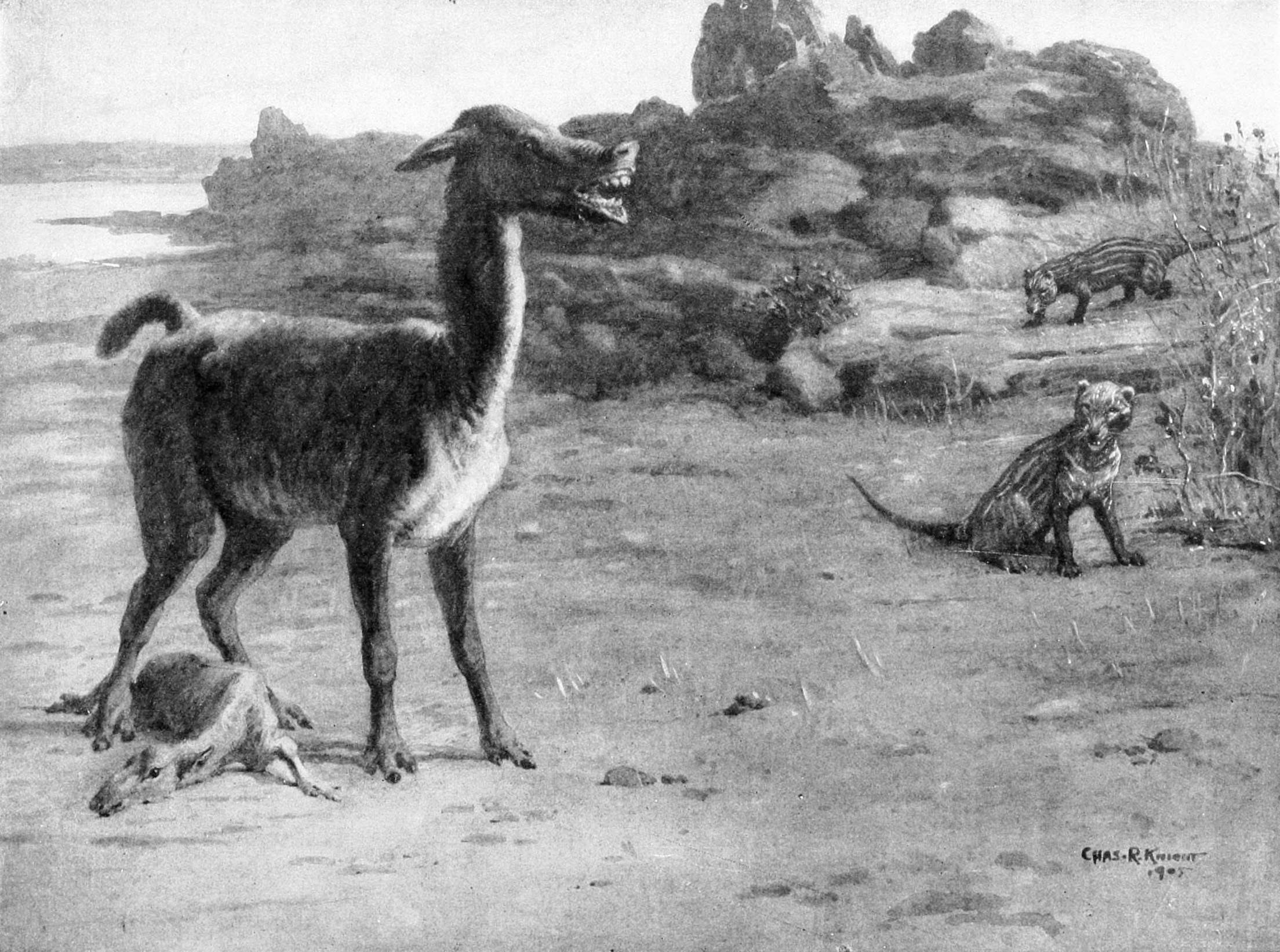
Restoration of Theosodon garretorum and Borhyaena tuberata

Theosodon was a terrestrial and cursorial animal that may have lived in both forests and more open environments. Due to its size and its long neck, Theosodon was likely a high browser, stripping leaves off of trees and shrubs high off the ground. Theosodon had a slender jaw compared to many other litopterns, indicating its food was softer, such as dicotyledons. As its nostrils are upward-facing and at the centre of its head rather than the front, Theosodon may have used this adaptation to feed on thorny plants. Some modern animals such as giraffes feed on thorny plants, and their nostrils are also further back and face more upwards than forwards.

Other fossils were found in the Sarmiento Formation of Argentina, the Yecua Formation of Bolivia, the Honda Group of Colombia, the Chucal and Río Frías Formations of Chile and the Ipururo Formation of Peru.
