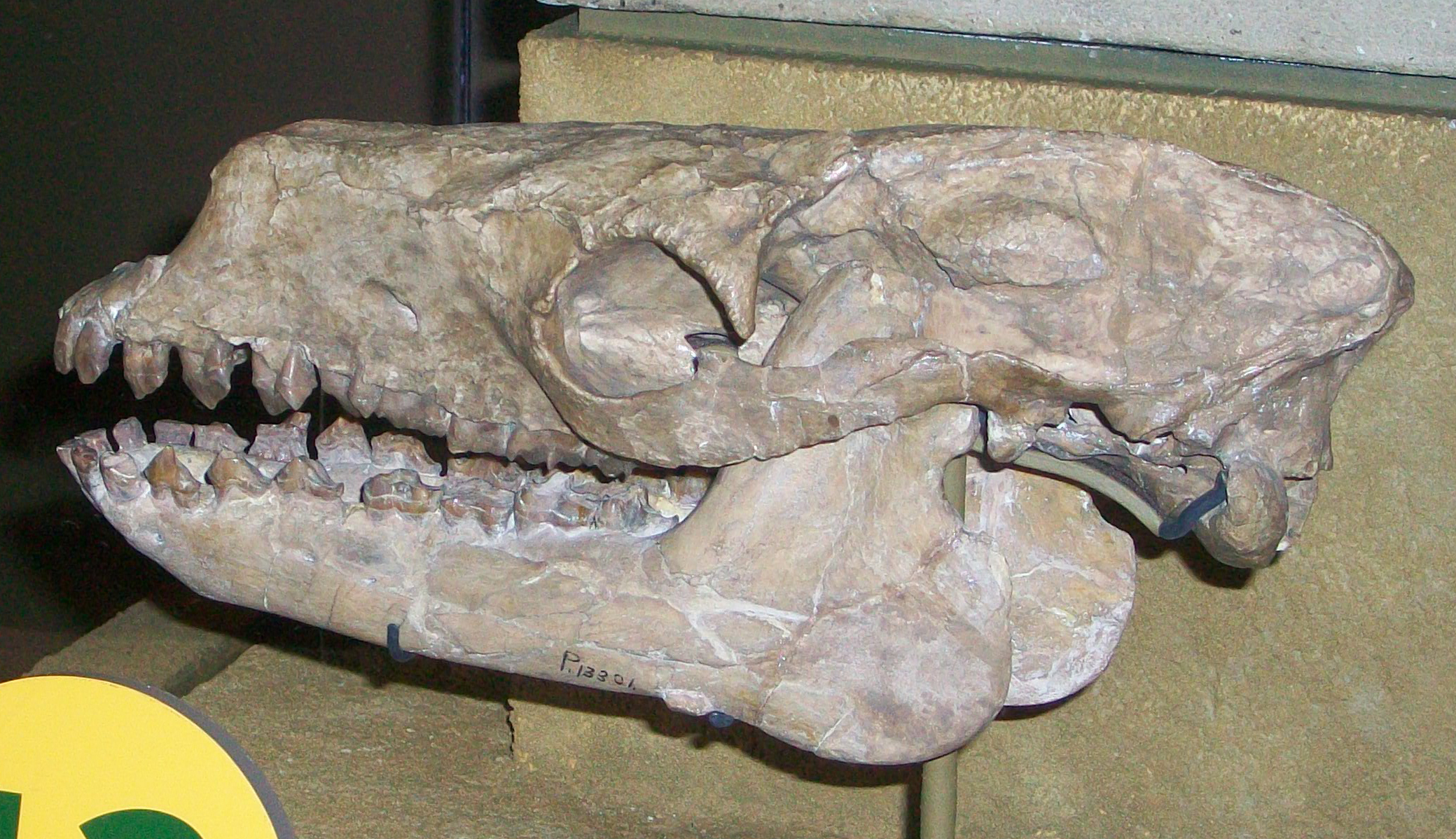
- Skull of Cramauchenia normalis in the Field Museum of Natural History

Scientific classification
- Kingdom: Animalia
- Phylum: Chordata
- Class: Mammalia
- Order: †Litopterna
- Family: †Macraucheniidae
- Subfamily: †Cramaucheniinae
- Genus: †Cramauchenia; Ameghino, 1902
- Species: †C. normalis

Binomial name
- †Cramauchenia normalis Ameghino, 1902

Synonyms
- C. insolita

= Cramauchenia =

Cramauchenia Temporal range: Late Oligocene-Early Miocene (Deseadan-Colhuehuapian) ~29.0–17.5 Ma

Extinct genus of litoptern South American ungulate

Cramauchenia is an extinct genus of litoptern South American ungulate. Cramauchenia was named by Florentino Ameghino. The name has no literal translation. Instead, it is an anagram of the name of a related genus Macrauchenia. This genus was initially discovered in the Sarmiento Formation in the Chubut Province, in Argentina, and later it was found in the Chichinales Formation in the Río Negro Province and the Cerro Bandera Formation in Neuquén, also in Argentina, in sediments assigned to the SALMA Colhuehuapian (in the Early Miocene), as well as the Agua de la Piedra Formation in Mendoza, in sediments dated to the Deseadan (during the Late Oligocene). In 1981 Soria made C. insolita a junior synonym of C. normalis. A specimen of C. normalis was described in 2010 from Cabeza Blanca (Chubut, Argentina) in the Sarmiento Formation, in sediments assigned to the Deseadan SALMA (Upper Oligocene).

== Description ==
This animal had an appearance vaguely similar to that of a small llama or perhaps that of a stocky antelope. The skull of this animal was relatively elongated and provided with a slightly recessed nasal opening, which would indicate the presence of a strong, muscular lip, likely prehensile. In similar but larger and more recent forms, such as Theosodon and Scalabrinitherium, this lip gradually developed, eventually giving rise to a possibly proboscis-like structure with Macrauchenia.

== Taxonomy ==
Cramauchenia was first described by Florentino Ameghino in 1902, based on fossils found in the Sarmiento Formation of Argentina. It is a primitive representative of the Macraucheniidae, a group of South American mammals belonging to the Litopterna, with forms similar to those of camelids, despite not being closely related. Cramauchenia is known for the sole species C. normalis. Another species, C. insolita, was initially described as a separate species, but following a study by Soria 1981 it has since been attributed to the type species. Furthermore, Cramauchenia has been assigned to the Cramaucheniinae, a subfamily including the most basal macraucheniids, however, many recent studies tend to indicate that the subfamily is paraphyletic, with Cramauchenia being most closely related to Pternoconius.

The following position of the Macraucheniidae is based on McGrath et al. 2018, showing the position of Cramauchenia.

- - Proadiantus excavatus
  - - Tricoelodus spp.
    - Macraucheniidae
      - Polymorphis lechei
      - - - Pternoconius spp.
          - Cramauchenia normalis
          - - - Coniopternium
              - Llullataruca shockeyi
            - - - Theosodon spp.
                - Theosodon arozquetai
              - Macraucheniinae
                - Scalabrinitherium bravardi
                - - - Huayqueriana cristata
                    - Huayqueriana cf. cristata
                  - - - Oxyodontherium zeballosi
                      - - Paranauchenia hystata
                        - Paranauchenia denticulata
                    - - Cullinia levis
                      - - - Promacrauchenia calchaquiorum
                          - Promacrauchenia antiqua
                        - - - Windhausenia delacroixi
                            - Xenorhinotherium bahiense
                          - - Macraucheniopsis ensenadensis
                            - Macrauchenia patachonica

== Paleoenvironment ==
Fossils of Cramauchenia have been found in various fossiliferous stratigraphic units in South America. Several specimens come from the Sarmiento Formation in the Golfo San Jorge Basin in central Patagonia, with other finds from the Agua de la Piedra, Cerro Bandera, and the Chichinales Formation of the Neuquén Basin.

In the Chichinales Formation, which is known for its local mammal fauna, Cramauchenia would have coexisted with astrapotheres, the notoungulates Cochilius volvens, Colpodon, Hegetotheriopsis, Hegetotherium and Protypotherium, the rodents Australoprocta, Caviocricetus, Eoviscaccia, and Willidewu, the armadillos Proeutatus and Stenotatus, and the sparassodont Cladosictis. Bird remains from the formation are comparatively poor. A part of a tibiotarsus has previously been classified as an undetermined species of psilopterine phorusrhacid. Other birds include an undetermined wading bird, Opisthodactylus horacioperezi, a species of rhea, and Patagorhacos, a phorusrhacid. During the Miocene the area likely consisted of open but wooded environment with temperate climate and a proximity to freshwater.

The Sarmiento Formation has provided a wide assemblage of mammals, including the astrapotheres Astrapotherium and Parastrapotherium, the notoungulates Argyrohippus, Cochilius, Colpodon, Interatherium, Pachyrukhos and Protypotherium, the fellow litopterns Lambdaconus, Paramacrauchenia, Proheptaconus, Prolicaphrium, Pternoconius, Tetramerorhinus and Theosodon, the xenarthrans Hapaloides, Holomegalonyx, Nematherium, Peltephilus, Proeutatus, Proschismotherium, Prozaedyus, Stegotherium, and Stenotatus, the metatherians Acyon, Acrocyon, Arctodictis, Borhyaena, Cladosictis Palaeothentes, Patagonia, and Sipalocyon, the rodents Acarechimys, Acaremys, Caviocricetus, Eosteiromys, Eoviscaccia, Hypsosteiromys, Neoreomys, Paradelphomys, Parasteiromys, Perimys, Prospaniomys, Prostichomys, Protacaremys, Protadelphomys, Sarremys and Soriamys, and the primates Homunculus, Mazzonicebus and Tremacebus. The late-surviving meridiolestidan Necrolestes was also present.
