= Ituzaingó Formation =

Geological formation in northeastern Argentina

- Stratigraphic range: Tortonian (Huayquerian); ~9.0–7.3 Ma
- Type: Geological formation
- Sub-units: Conglomerado Osifero Member
- Underlies: Puerto Alvear, Hernandarías, Timbúes & Yupoí Formations
- Overlies: Paraná & Rosario Formations
- Area: 120,000 km^{2} (46,000 sq mi)
- Thickness: Up to 150 m (490 ft); Typically 10–20 m (33–66 ft)

Lithology
- Primary: Sandstone, mudstone
- Other: Conglomerate

Location
- Location: Mesopotamia
- Coordinates: 31.7°S 60.4°W
- Approximate paleocoordinates: 31.8°S 58.3°W
- Region: Corrientes, Santa Fe & Entre Ríos Provinces
- Country: Argentina
- Extent: Paraná Basin

Type section
- Named for: Ituzaingó
- Named by: De Alba
- Year defined: 1953
- Ituzaingó Formation (Argentina)

The Ituzaingó Formation (Spanish: Formación Ituzaingó), in older literature also described as Entre Ríos or Entrerriana Formation, is an extensive geological formation of Late Miocene (Tortonian, or Huayquerian in the SALMA classification) age in the Paraná Basin of the Corrientes, Santa Fe and Entre Ríos Provinces in Mesopotamia, northeastern Argentina. The formation comprises mudstones, cross-bedded sandstones and conglomerates deposited in a fluvio-deltaic environment and is renowned for the preservation of a rich fossil assemblage, including many mammals, birds, reptiles, fish, bivalves, foraminifera, ichnofossils and flora.

== Description ==
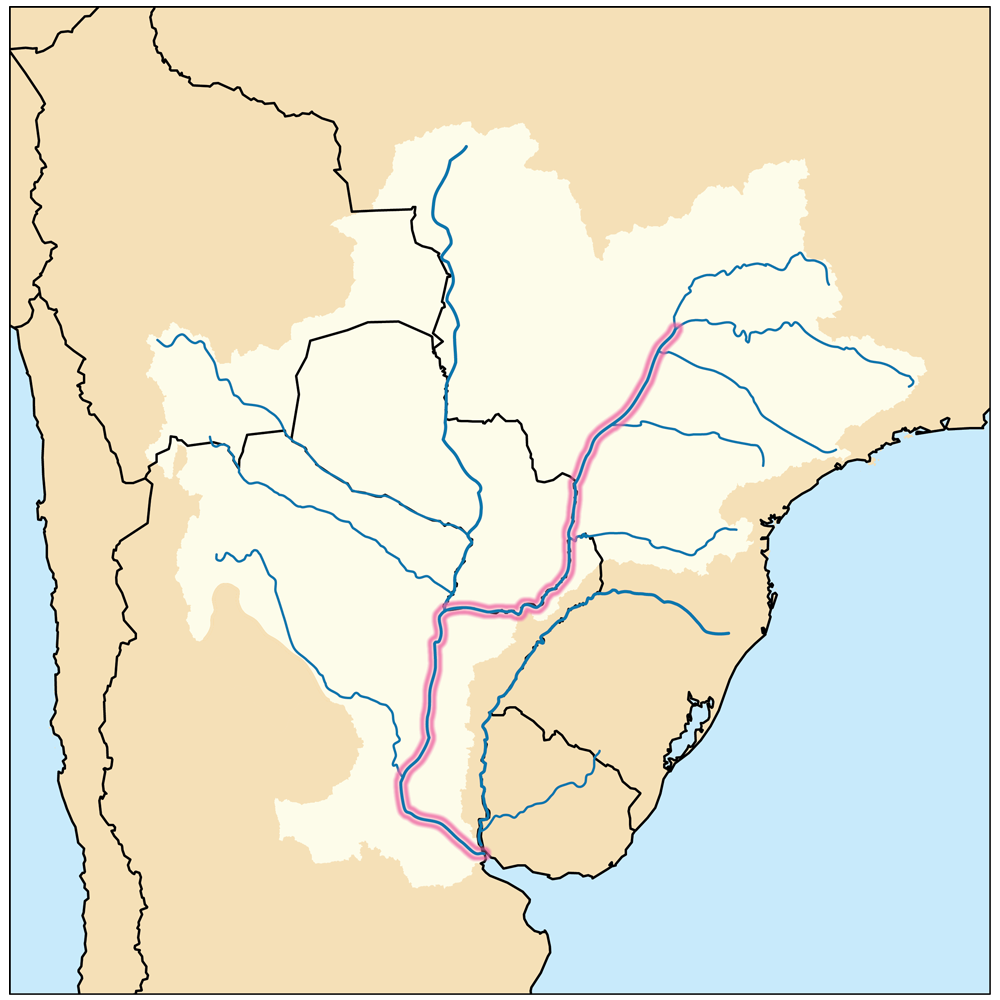
Map of the Paraná River drainage basin with the river indicated. Most outcrops of the Ituzaingó Formation flank the middle course of the Paraná River.

The Ituzaingó Formation was first described by De Alba in 1953 and later by Herbst in 1971. The up to 150 metres (490 ft), but in most areas between 10 and 20 metres (33 and 66 ft) thick formation is found in an area of 120,000 square kilometres (46,000 sq mi), stretching from the Paraná River to 40 kilometres (25 mi) east of Tostado. The Ituzaingó Formation crops out in the northeasternmost part of Argentina (Mesopotamia), in the provinces of Corrientes, Santa Fe and Entre Ríos, among other locations along the banks of the Paraná River.

=== Stratigraphy ===
The formation overlies the marine Paraná Formation and is unconformably overlain by the Puerto Alvear, Hernandarías and Yupoí Formations of Early Pleistocene (Uquian and Ensenadan respectively) age. At the shores of the Paraná River, the formation underlies the Timbúes Formation. In certain places along the same river, the formation cuts into the underlying Rosario Formation.

The formation contains a basal conglomeratic member "Conglomerado osífero" (bony conglomerate) with abundant vertebrate remains. This conglomerate is overlain by almost unfossiliferous whitish to yellow brown sandstones and green mudstones. The Ituzaingó Formation (as Entre Ríos Formation) was correlated with the Puelches Formation of the subsurface of Buenos Aires Province. According to the mammals occurring in the conglomerate and the stratigraphic relationships, the age of the base of Ituzaingo Formation is almost exclusively Tortonian (Late Miocene) or Huayquerian in the SALMA classification.

=== Depositional environment ===
The formation, as the Paraná and Puelches Formations, has been deposited in a vast Miocene tidal flat environment. Both the terrestrial and freshwater fauna of the Ituzaingó Formation indicates a climate warmer than present. The freshwater vertebrate record suggests important basin connections with Amazonian basins.

Alternatively, the Conglomerado Osífero Member has been interpreted as tide-dominated fluvial channels, pertaining to the marine Paraná Formation.

== Fossil content ==
The Ituzaingó Formation has provided a large variety of fossils, of various groups, from mammals to birds and reptiles to fish and flora. The terrestrial fauna is predominant while a few marine genera are also present. The presence of typical Amazonian freshwater fish and absence of austral fauna in both the underlying Paraná and the Ituzaingó Formation suggests a connection with northern areas of South America. The faunas has been correlated to the older Miocene faunas of the Honda Group at La Venta in Colombia, the Urumaco Formation at Urumaco in Venezuela and the Pebas Formation of the Amazon region of Colombia, Ecuador, Peru and Brazil. Several ground sloth genera present in the Ituzaingó Formation are endemic from this unit, whereas other are also present in the Arroyo Chasicó Formation of Buenos Aires Province, the Andalhuala and Corral Quemado Formations of Catamarca Province, and the Toro Negro Formation of La Rioja Province.

=== Birds ===
Taxa	Species	Presence	Abundance	Description	Images	Notes
Andalgalornis	A. steulleti				Andalgalornis Palaelodus	
Devincenzia	D. pozzi				Andalgalornis Palaelodus	
Macranhinga	M. paranensis				Andalgalornis Palaelodus	
Macranhinga	M. ranzii				Andalgalornis Palaelodus	
Palaelodus	P. cf. ambiguus				Andalgalornis Palaelodus	
Rhea	R. (Pterocnemia) mesopotamica				Andalgalornis Palaelodus	
Megapaloelodus	M. sp.				Andalgalornis Palaelodus	
Phoenicopteridae	Indeterminate.				Andalgalornis Palaelodus	
Phorusrhacidae	Indetermidate.				Andalgalornis Palaelodus	
Rallidae	Indeterminate.				Andalgalornis Palaelodus	
Rheidae	Indeterminate.				Andalgalornis Palaelodus	

=== Mammals ===
==== Chiroptera ====
Taxa	Species	Presence	Abundance	Description	Images	Notes
Eumysops	E. parodii					
Notictis	N. ortizi					

==== Cetaceans ====
Taxa	Species	Presence	Abundance	Description	Images	Notes
Saurocetes	S. gigas					
Iniidae indet.						

==== Litopterns ====
Taxa	Species	Presence	Abundance	Description	Images	Notes
Brachytherium	B. cuspidatum					
Cullinia	C. sp.					
Diadiaphorus	D. paranensis					
Neobrachytherium	N. ameghinoi					
Oxyodontherium	O. piramydatus					
Oxyodontherium	O. zeballosi					
Paranauchenia	P. denticulata					
Promacrauchenia	P. antiqua					
Proterotherium	P. cervioides					
Scalabrinitherium	S. bravardi					
Scalabrinitherium	S. rothii					

==== Marsupials ====
Taxa	Species	Presence	Abundance	Description	Images	Notes
Philander	P. entrerianus					
Chironectes	C. sp.					
Zygolestes	Z. paranensis					

==== Sparassodonts ====
Taxa	Species	Presence	Abundance	Description	Images	Notes
Thylacosmilus	T. atrox					
Stylocynus	S. paranensis					

==== Rodents ====
Taxa	Species	Presence	Abundance	Description	Images	Notes
Briaromys	B. trouessartianus					
Cardiatherium	C. paranense					
Carlesia	C. pendolai					
Diaphoromys	D. compressidens					
Diaphoromys	D. gamayensis					
Diaphoromys	D. mesopotamicus					
Eumegamys	E. contortus					
Eumegamys	E. dubius					
Eumegamys	E. scalabrinianus					
Eumegamys	E. paranensis					
Eumegamysops	E. praependens					
Gyriabrus	G. glutinatus					
Gyriabrus	G. holmbergi					
Gyriabrus	G. indivisus					
Gyriabrus	G. rebagliattii					
Haplostropha	H. sacabriniana					
Isostylomys	I. ameghinoi					
Isostylomys	I. laurillardi					
Lagostomopsis	L. antiquus					
Lagostomopsis	L. pallidens					
Myocastor	M. obesus					
Myocastor	M. paranensis					
Myocastor	M. sinuata					
Neoepiblema	N. ambrosettianus					
Neoepiblema	N. horridula					
Olenopsis	O. typicus					
Paradoxomys	P. cancrivorus					
Pentastylodon	P. racedi					
Perimys	P. scalabrinianus					
Phoberomys	P. burmeisteri					
Phugatherium	P. cataclisticum					
Potamarchus	P. murinus					
Potamarchus	P. sigmodon					
Protabrocoma	P. paranensis					
Pseudosigmomys	P. paranensis					
Rusconia	R. crassidens					
Telodontomys	T. compressidens					
Tetrastylus	T. aguilari					
Tetrastylus	T. diffusus					
Tetrastylus	T. laevigatus					
Tetrastylus	T. robustus					
Tetrastylus	T. (Protelicomys) atavus					
Cardiomys						
Caviodon						
Paleocavia						
Pliodolichotis						
Prodolichotis						

==== Toxodonts ====
Taxa	Species	Presence	Abundance	Description	Images	Notes
Adinotherium	?A. paranense					
Dinotoxodon	D. paranensis					
Eutomodus	E. elautus					
Haplodontherium	H. limun					
Stenotephanos	S. plicidens					

==== Typotheres ====
Taxa	Species	Presence	Abundance	Description	Images	Notes
Munyizia	M. paranensis					
Protypotherium	P. antiquum					

==== Xenarthrans ====
===== Cingulates =====
Taxa	Species	Presence	Abundance	Description	Images	Notes
Chasicotatus	C. spinozai					
Comaphorus	C. concisus			A dubious glyptodont.		
Dasypus	D. neogarus			Relatives of nine-banded armadillos.		
Eleutherocercus	E. paranensis			A glyptodont.		
Kraglievichia	K. paranense					
Macroeuphractus	M. retusus					
Palaehoplophorus	P. antiquus					
Plohophorus	P. paranensis					
Proeuphractus	P. limpidus					
Protoglyptodon	P. primiformis					
Scirrotherium	S. carinatum					
Trachycalyptus	?T. cingulatus					
Urotherium	U. interundatum					
Zaedyus	?Z. sp.					

===== Ground sloths =====
Taxa	Species	Presence	Abundance	Description	Images	Notes
Amphiocnus	A. paranense					
Eomegatherium	E. nanum					
Megabradys	M. darwini					
Megalonychops	M. primigenius					
Mesopotamocnus	M. brevirostrum					
Neohapalops	N. rothi					
Octomylodon	O. aversus					
Ortotherium	O. laticurvatum					
Paranabradys	P. vucetichae					
Pliomegatherium	P. lelongi					
Pliomorphus	P. ameghinoi					
Pliomorphus	P. gracilis					
Pliomorphus	P. mutilatus					
Pliomorphus	P. robustus					
Prolestodon	P. antiquus					
Prolestodon	P. paranensis					
Promegatherium	P. parvulum					
Promegatherium	P. smaltatum					
Promylodon	P. paranensis					
Pronothrotherium	P. mirabilis					
Protomegalonyx	P. doellojuradoi					
Protomegalonyx	P. praecursor					
Pseudoeuryurus	P. lelongianus					
Pyramiodontherium	P. sp.					
Ranculcus	R. scalabrinianus					
Scelidotheriidae	Indeterminate.					
Sphenotherus	S. paranensis					
Strabosodon	S. acuticavus					
Strabosodon	S. obtusicavus					
Torcellia	T. paranense					

==== Other Mammals ====
Taxa	Species	Presence	Abundance	Description	Images	Notes
Cyonasua	C. Argentina					

=== Reptiles ===
Taxa	Species	Presence	Abundance	Description	Images	Notes
Caiman	C. australis			Different species of the genus Caiman, some of which are still extant.	Broad-snouted caiman	
Caiman	C. cf. yacare			Different species of the genus Caiman, some of which are still extant.	Broad-snouted caiman	
Caiman	C. latriostris			Different species of the genus Caiman, some of which are still extant.	Broad-snouted caiman	
Caiman	C. yacare			Different species of the genus Caiman, some of which are still extant.	Broad-snouted caiman	
Gryposuchus	G. neogaeus			A giant extinct gavialid crocodilian.		
Mourasuchus	M. arendsi					
Paranacaiman	P. bravardi					
Paranasuchus	P. gasparinae					
Tupinambis	T. cf. merianae					
Parahydraspis	P. paranaensis					
Phrynops	P. cf. geoffroanus					
Testudo	T. paranensis					
Purussaurus	P. sp.					

=== Fish ===
Taxa	Species	Presence	Abundance	Description	Images	Notes
Colossoma	C. macropomum					
Megapiranha	M. paranensis					
Potamotrygon	P. motoro					
Squatina	S. dumeril					
Phractocephalus	P. ivy					
Cynodontidae	Indetermidate.					

=== Invertebrates ===
Taxa	Species	Presence	Abundance	Description	Images	Notes
Protelphidium	P. tuberculatum					
Ostrea	O. sp.					

=== Microflora ===
Taxa	Species	Presence	Abundance	Description	Images	Notes
Anadenantheroxylon	A. villaurquicense					
Astroniumxylon	A. bonplandianum					
Astroniumxylon	A. parabalansae					
Curtiembreoxylon	C. poledrii					
Gleditsioxylon	G. paramorphoides					
Guadua	G. morronei					
Guadua	G. zuloagae					
Laurinoxylon	L. artabeae					
Mangroveoxylon	M.areniensis					
Menendoxylon	M. vasallensis					
Microlobiusxylon	M. paranaensis					
Maytenoxylon	M. sp.					
Mimosoxylon	M. sp.					
Palmoxylon	P. yuqueriense					
Prosopisinoxylon	P. americanum					
Prumnopityoxylon	P. gnaedingerae					
Ruprechtioxylon	R. breae					
Scalarixylon	S. sp.					
Schinopsixylon	S. heckii					
Soroceaxylon	S. entrerriensis					
Syagrus	S. sp.					
Uruguaianoxylon	U. striata					

=== Icnofossils ===
Taxa	Species	Presence	Abundance	Description	Images	Notes
Arenicolites						

== Huayquerian correlations ==
Huayquerian correlations in South America
Formation	Cerro Azul	Ituzaingó	Paraná	Camacho	Raigón	Andalhuala	Chiquimil	Las Flores	Maimará	Palo	Pebas	Muyu	Rosa	Saldungaray	Salicas	Urumaco	Map
Basin	Colorado	Paraná				Hualfín		Tontal	Andes	Salta	Amazon	Huasi	Altiplano	BA	Velasco	Falcón	Ituzaingó Formation (South America)
Country	Argentina			Uruguay		Argentina					Brazil Peru	Bolivia		Argentina		Venezuela	Ituzaingó Formation (South America)
Cardiatherium																	Ituzaingó Formation (South America)
Lagostomus																	Ituzaingó Formation (South America)
Macroeuphractus																	Ituzaingó Formation (South America)
Proeuphractus																	Ituzaingó Formation (South America)
Pronothrotherium																	Ituzaingó Formation (South America)
Pseudotypotherium																	Ituzaingó Formation (South America)
Thylacosmilus																	Ituzaingó Formation (South America)
Xotodon																	Ituzaingó Formation (South America)
Macraucheniidae																	Ituzaingó Formation (South America)
Primates																	Ituzaingó Formation (South America)
Rodents																	Ituzaingó Formation (South America)
Reptiles																	Ituzaingó Formation (South America)
Birds																	Ituzaingó Formation (South America)
Terror birds																	Ituzaingó Formation (South America)
Flora																	Ituzaingó Formation (South America)
Environments	Aeolian-fluvial	Fluvio-deltaic			Fluvial						Fluvio-lacustrine	Fluvial			Fluvio-lacustrine	Fluvio-deltaic	Huayquerian volcanoclastics Huayquerian fauna Huayquerian flora
Volcanic						Yes											Huayquerian volcanoclastics Huayquerian fauna Huayquerian flora

== See also ==
- South American land mammal ages
- Honda Group
- Pebas Formation
- Urumaco
- Battle of Ituzaingó
