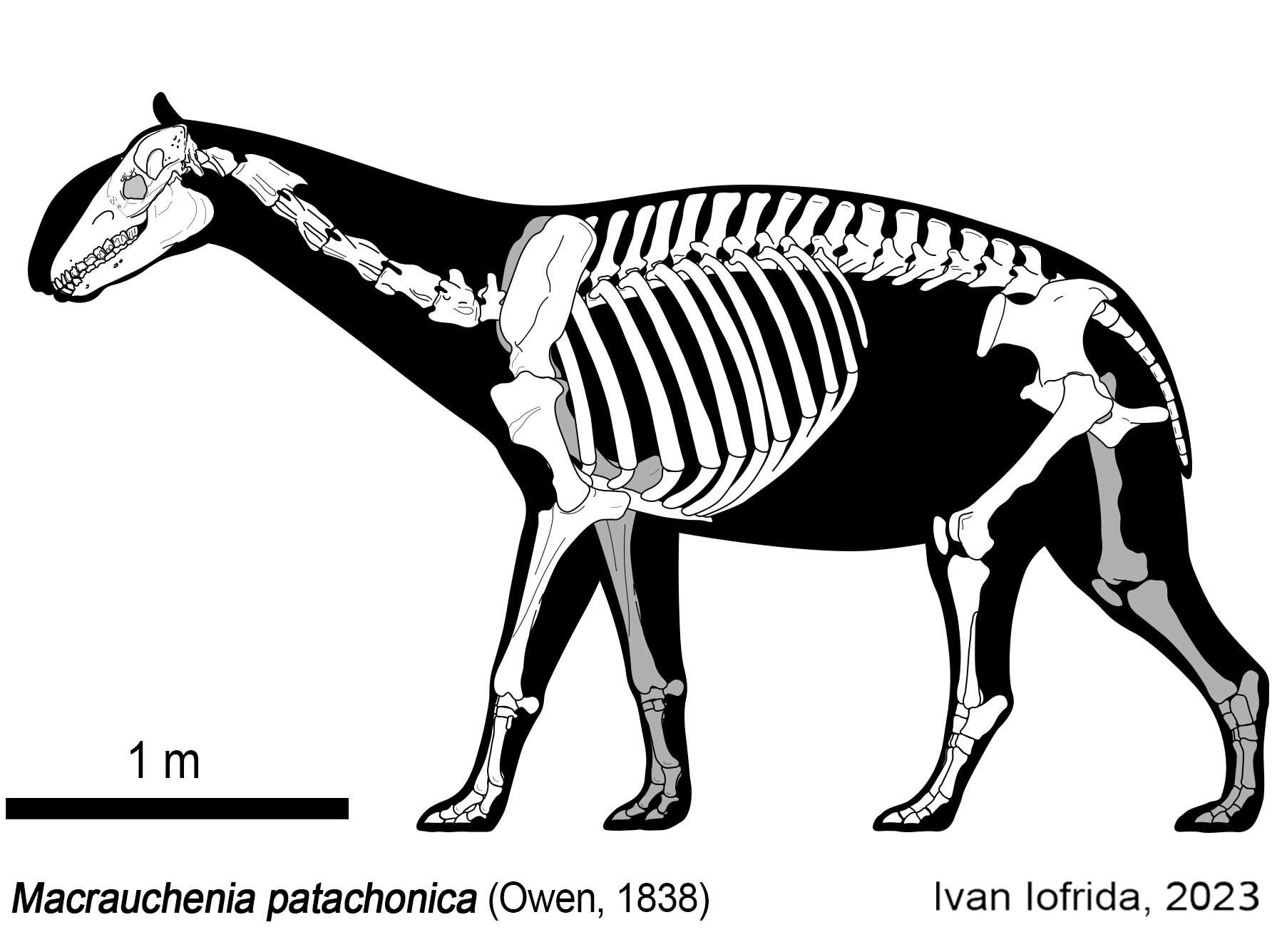
- Skeleton of Macrauchenia patachonica
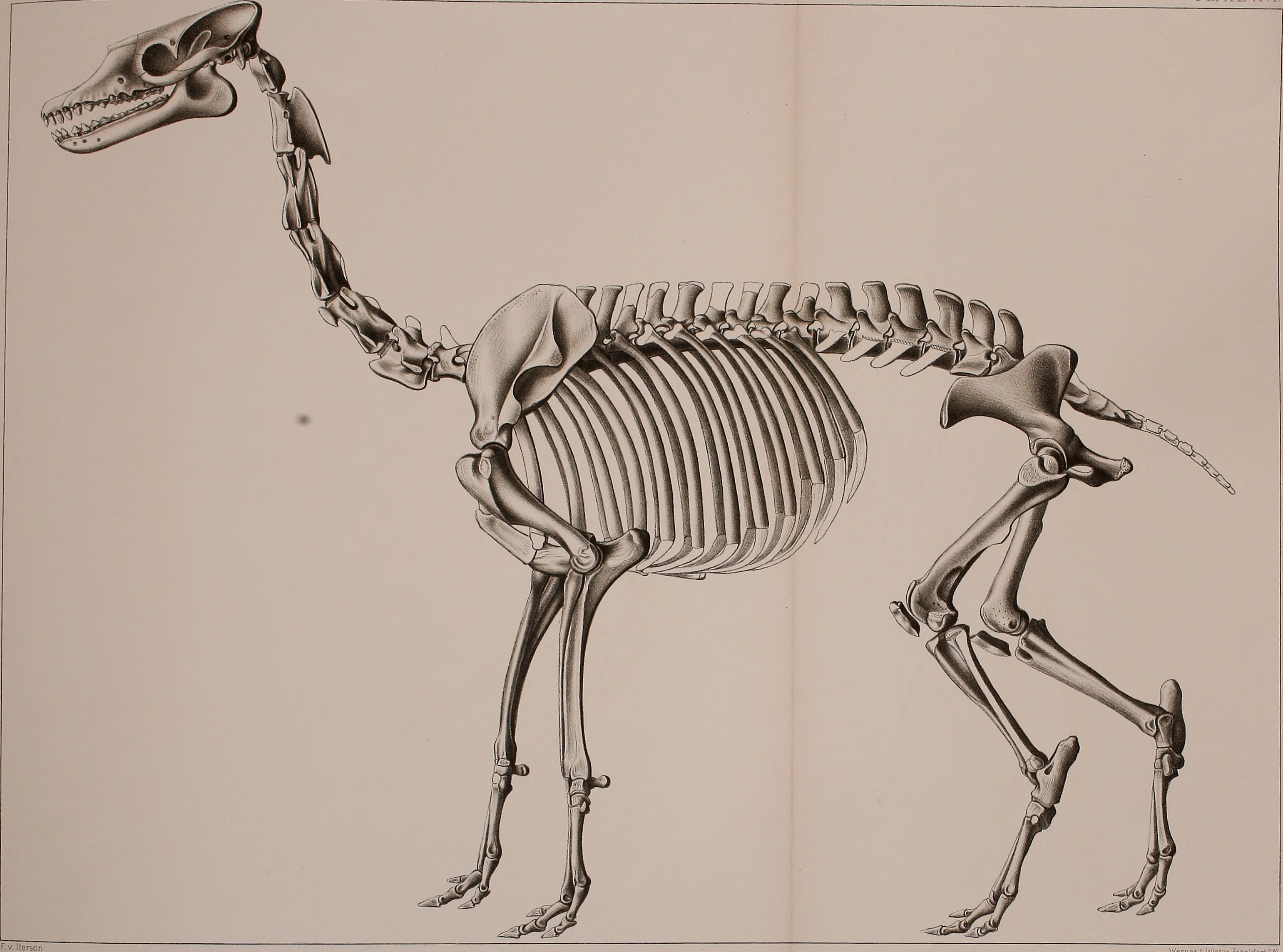
- Skeleton of Thesodon

Scientific classification
- Kingdom: Animalia
- Phylum: Chordata
- Class: Mammalia
- Order: †Litopterna
- Superfamily: †Macrauchenioidea
- Family: †Macraucheniidae; Gill, 1872

Subfamilies and genera
- †Amilnedwardsia; †Llullataruca; †Polymorphis; †Cramaucheniinae; †Macraucheniinae; †Cullinia; †Huayqueriana; †Macrauchenia; †Macraucheniopsis; †Micrauchenia; †Oxyodontherium; †Paranauchenia; †Promacrauchenia; †Scalabrinitherium; †Windhausenia; †Xenorhinotherium

= Macraucheniidae =

Macraucheniidae Temporal range: Oligocene–Holocene (Deseadan-Lujanian)

Family in the extinct order Litopterna

Macraucheniidae is a family in the extinct South American ungulate order Litopterna, that resembled camelids. They had three functional digits on the fore and hind feet, as well as elongate necks. The family is generally divided up into two subfamilies, Cramaucheniinae (which may be paraphyletic) and Macraucheniinae. The family shows retraction of the nasal region, most extremely to the top of the skull in derived macraucheniine taxa like Macrauchenia. which has been interpreted to have supported a proboscis, perhaps like that of a saiga antelope to filter dust, or a moose-like prehensile lip. The earliest unambiguous members of the family date to the late Oligocene around 30 million years ago. Polymorphis from the Eocene has historically been placed as a macraucheniid, but this has been doubted. Most early representatives had a body masses in the range of 80–120 kilograms (180–260 lb), though some like Llullataruca were as small as 35–55 kilograms (77–121 lb), and the last representatives of the family from the Pleistocene like Macrauchenia were over 1,000 kilograms (2,200 lb). The family reached its apex of diversity during the late Miocene around 10-6 million years ago, before declining to only a few species belong to the genera Macrauchenia and Xenorhinotherium by the Late Pleistocene.

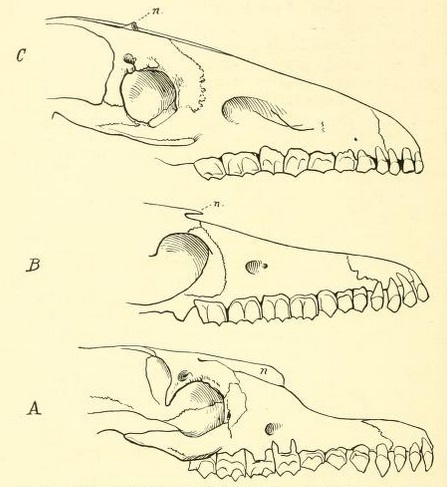
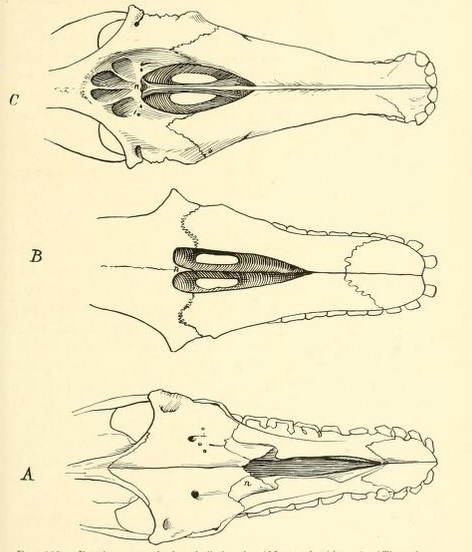
(A) Theosodon, (B) Scalabrinitherium, (C) Macrauchenia, portraying how the nasal bones shifted backwards on the skull, with the nasal opening following suit.

Below is a phylogenetic tree of the Macraucheniidae, after McGrath et al. 2018:.

- - Proadiantus excavatus
  - - Tricoelodus spp.
    - Macraucheniidae
      - Polymorphis lechei
      - - - Pternoconius spp.
          - Cramauchenia normalis
          - - - Coniopternium
              - Llullataruca shockeyi
            - - - Theosodon spp.
                - Theosodon arozquetai
              - Macraucheniinae
                - Scalabrinitherium bravardi
                - - - Huayqueriana cristata
                    - Huayqueriana cf. cristata
                  - - - Oxyodontherium zeballosi
                      - - Paranauchenia hystata
                        - Paranauchenia denticulata
                    - - Cullinia levis
                      - - - Promacrauchenia calchaquiorum
                          - Promacrauchenia antiqua
                        - - - Windhausenia delacroixi
                            - Xenorhinotherium bahiense
                          - - Macraucheniopsis ensenadensis
                            - Macrauchenia patachonica

Cladogram of Macraucheniidae after Lobo, Gelfo & Azevedo (2024):

- Macraucheniidae
  - Cramaucheniidae
    - Pternoconius
    - - Coniopternium
      - Cramauchenia
      - Thesodon
  - Macraucheniinae
    - Paranauchenia
    - - Llullataruca
      - Cullinia
      - Scalabrinitherium
      - Huayqueriana
      - - Promacrauchenia
        - - Windhausenia
          - - Xenorhinotherium
            - - Macraucheniopsis
              - Macrauchenia
