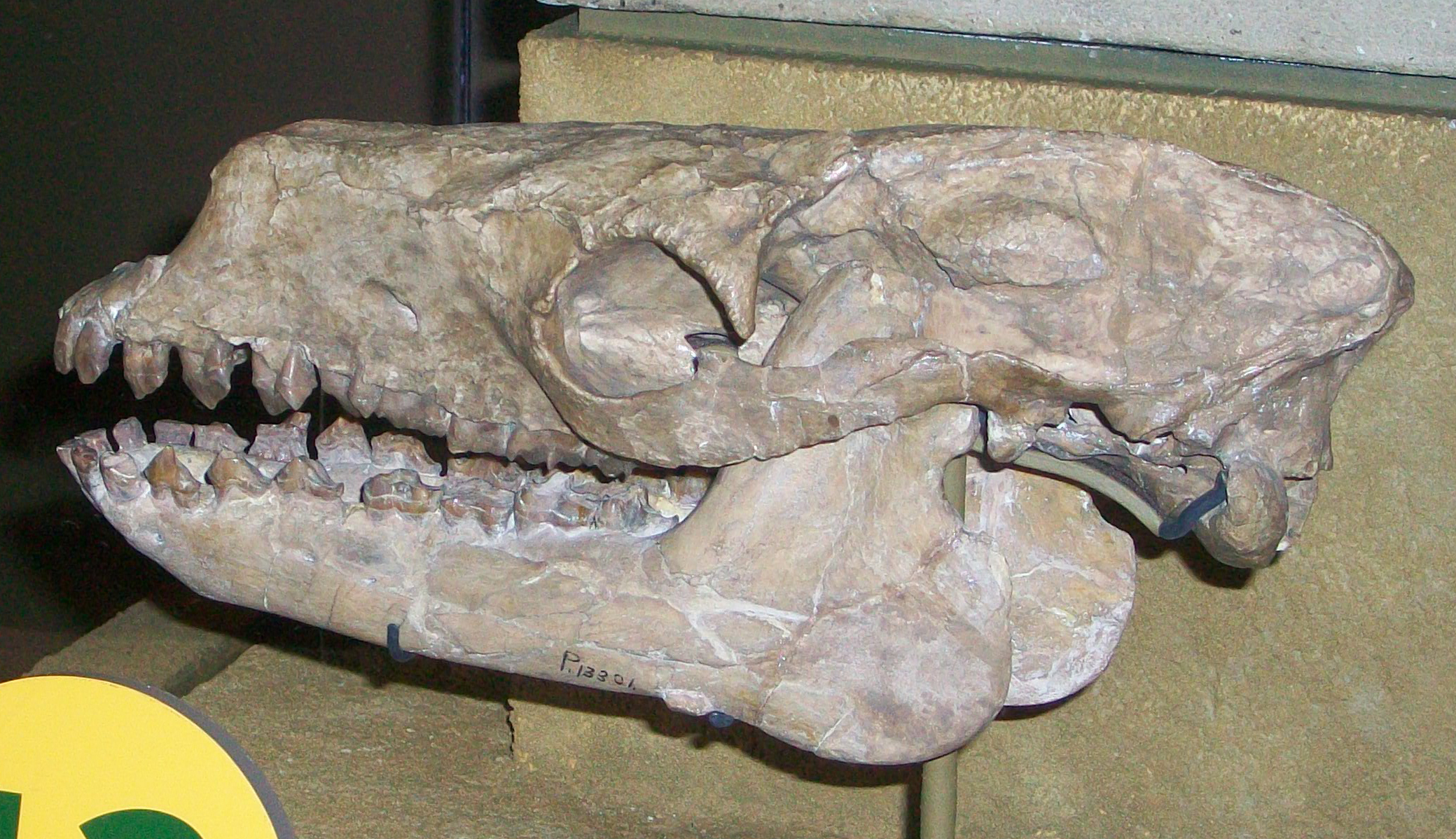
- Skull of Cramauchenia

Scientific classification
- Kingdom: Animalia
- Phylum: Chordata
- Class: Mammalia
- Order: †Litopterna
- Superfamily: †Macrauchenioidea
- Family: †Macraucheniidae
- Subfamily: †Cramaucheniinae; Ameghino, 1902

Genera
- †Caliphrium; †Coniopternium; †Cramauchenia; †Llullataruca; †Phoenixauchenia; †Polymorphis?; †Pternoconius; †Theosodon

= Cramaucheniinae =

Cramaucheniinae Temporal range: Middle Eocene-Middle Miocene (Mustersan-Mayoan) ~48–11.8 Ma

Extinct subfamily of mammals

Cramaucheniinae is a paraphyletic or monophyletic subfamily of macraucheniids that originated in the middle Eocene (Mustersan SALMA). The size range of the group ranged from small, basal forms to larger and more derived forms. During their evolution, the cramaucheniines undergone a trend from evolving from small basal forms such as Polymorphis into larger, more derived taxa such as Theosodon.
