= Amilnedwardsia =

Scientific classification
- Kingdom: Animalia
- Phylum: Chordata
- Class: Mammalia
- Order: †Litopterna
- Family: †Macraucheniidae
- Genus: †Amilnedwardsia; Ameghino, 1901
- Species: †A. brevicula

Binomial name
- †Amilnedwardsia brevicula Ameghino, 1901

Other species
- † A. acutidens Ameghino, 1901

Extinct species of ungulate

Amilnedwardsia is a genus of extinct ungulates in the family Macraucheniidae. The type species is Amilnedwardsia brevicula which lived between 47.8 and 38.0 million years ago in modern-day Argentina.
