= Llullataruca =

Llullataruca Temporal range: Middle Miocene (Laventan) ~13.8–11.8 Ma

Scientific classification
- Kingdom: Animalia
- Phylum: Chordata
- Class: Mammalia
- Infraclass: Placentalia
- Order: †Litopterna
- Family: †Macraucheniidae
- Genus: †Llullataruca; McGrath, Anaya & Croft, 2018
- Species: †L. shockeyi

Binomial name
- †Llullataruca shockeyi McGrath, Anaya & Croft, 2018

Extinct genus of litopterns

Llullataruca is an extinct genus of macraucheniid litoptern. It lived during the Middle Miocene of what is now Bolivia.

== Etymology ==
The genus name, Llullataruca, is derived from the Quechua words llulla meaning "false", "lie" or "deceitful", and taruca, meaning "deer", an indigenous language of the Quebrada Honda region, which refers to the presumed habits of the small-to mid-sized macraucheniids as cursorial browsers or mixed feeders, a niche filled today in many parts of the world, including southern Bolivia, by cervids. The species name, shockeyi honors of Bruce Shockey for his endless efforts to improve knowledge of Cenozoic mammals in Bolivia and his many insights that have improved other scientists understanding of the paleobiology of native South American ungulates, including macraucheniids.

== Description ==
This animal is known only from incomplete remains, mainly a jaw with teeth, but from comparison with better known similar animals, such as Cramauchenia, one can hypothesize its appearance: Llullataruca would have been a medium-sized animal, vaguely similar to a small deer without horns, with a relatively slender structure. It is estimated that it should not exceed 50 kilograms in weight by much, making it one of the smallest known macraucheniids.

== Classification and history ==
First described in 2018, Llullataruca shockeyi is known for a mandible comprising the entire lower dentition, some upper teeth and various postcranial elements found in Bolivia, in the Tarija Department (Quebrada Honda). Other fragmentary remains, attributable to the same genus, have been found in slightly older soils in the Cerdas area.

Llullataruca is a member of the Macraucheniidae, the best-known family of Litopterna, comprising animals of medium to large sizes and with a body form comparable to that of deer, horses or camels. In particular, Llullataruca has been recovered as the sister taxon to Coniopternium within the paraphyletic subfamily Cramaucheniinae, comprising the less derived and more ancient macraucheniids. Llullataruca, found in deposits from the middle Miocene, would show that the archaic morphotype of the macraucheniids was still present at this time in the northern parts of South America, when in Patagonia the archaic cramaucheniines had become extinct for at least 7 million years.
