= Proadiantus =

Proadiantus Temporal range: Late Oligocene ~28–24 Ma

Scientific classification
- Kingdom: Animalia
- Phylum: Chordata
- Class: Mammalia
- Order: †Litopterna
- Family: †Adianthidae
- Subfamily: †Adianthinae
- Genus: †Proadiantus; Ameghino 1897

Type species
- †Proadiantus excavatus Ameghino, 1897

Species
- P. excavatus Ameghino 1897

Synonyms
- Proadiantus pungidens Ameghino 1901

Extinct genus of litopterns

Proadiantus (Ameghino, 1897) is an extinct genus of adianthid litoptern. It lived during the Late Oligocene, in what is today South America. It consists of only 1 species, Proadiantus excavatus.

== Description ==
This animal is mainly known from fossil remains of its teeth, maxilla and mandible, and its appearance is therefore difficult to restore. It is assumed, from comparison with its better known relatives Adianthus and Adiantoides, that it was a small and slender litoptern.

Proadiantus differs from Adiantoides by its significantly larger size, and it may have been as large as a coyote. The molars had rather low upper crowns; the upper molars had a mesostyle, but no clearly defined metastyle; the hypoconus was elongated. The talonid of the second lower molar had a complex structure.

== Classification ==
Proadiantus was one of the Adianthidae, a family of small sized litopterns with a characteristic dentition. Proadiantus seems to have been one of the most basal members of the group, at the basis of the subfamily Adianthinae. It was closely related to Thadanius and Tricoelodus.

Proadiantus excavatus was first described in 1897 by Florentino Ameghino, based on fossilized remains from the Cabeza Blanca locality of the Sarmiento Formation, in the Chubut Province of Argentine Patagonia. The species Proadiantus pungidens, described several years later by Ameghino himself based on fossils from the same geological horizon, is now considered identical to the type species.

== Bibliography ==
- F. Ameghino. 1897. Mammiféres crétacés de l’Argentine (Deuxième contribution à la connaissance de la fauna mammalogique de couches à Pyrotherium) [Cretaceous mammals of Argentina (second contribution to the knowledge of the mammalian fauna of the Pyrotherium Beds)]. Boletin Instituto Geografico Argentino 18(4–9):406-521
- F. Ameghino. 1901. Notices préliminaires sur des ongulés nouveaux des terrains crétacés de Patagonie [Preliminary notes on new ungulates from the Cretaceous terrains of Patagonia]. Boletin de la Academia Nacional de Ciencias de Córdoba 16:349-429
- G. G. Simpson and J. L. Minoprio. 1949. A new adianthine litoptern and associated mammals from a Deseadan faunule in Mendoza, Argentina. American Museum Novitates 1434:1-27
- R. L. Cifelli and M. F. Soria. 1983. Systematics of the Adianthidae (Litopterna, Mammalia). American Museum Novitates 2771:1-25
