= Polymorphis =

Polymorphis Temporal range: Middle Eocene (Mustersan) ~48.0–42.0 Ma

Scientific classification
- Kingdom: Animalia
- Phylum: Chordata
- Class: Mammalia
- Order: †Litopterna
- Family: †Macraucheniidae
- Subfamily: †Cramaucheniinae
- Genus: †Polymorphis; Roth, 1899

Type species
- †Polymorphis lechei Roth, 1899

Synonyms
- Megacrodon Roth, 1899; Polyacrodon Roth, 1899; Decaconus Ameghino, 1901; Oroacrodon Ameghino, 1904; Periacrodon Ameghino, 1904

Extinct genus of litopterns

Polymorphis is an extinct genus of litopterns belonging to the family Macraucheniidae. It lived during the Middle Eocene of Argentina.

== Taxonomy ==
The type species of Polymorphis is Polymorphis lechei. Both the genus and the species were named by Santiago Roth in 1899. The lectotype of P. lechei is the left half of a mandible with teeth.

Two other species, Megacrodon planus and "Lambdaconus" alius, have been previously assigned to Polymorphis, but are poorly known and may not belong to the genus.

Megacrodon, Polyacrodon (which has the junior objective synonym Oroacrodon), Decaconus, and Periacrodon have been considered synonyms of Polymorphis.

Polymorphis is the most basal member of Macraucheniidae. It is considered to be either part of the paraphyletic subfamily Cramaucheniinae, or in a monotypic subfamily of its own, Polymorphinae.

Polymorphis is known from the Eocene of Argentina, belonging to the Mustersan South American land mammal age, and is the earliest known macraucheniid.

== Description ==
This animal is only known from fossils of teeth and a mandible, and it is therefore impossible to faithfully restore its appearance. Polymorphis was a small to medium sized litoptern, probably with a rather slender build. The mandible was characterized by a still primitive complete dentition; on the molars, the trigonid was complete; the paraconid and the metaconid were nearly of equal size and separated by a narrow groove.

== History of study ==
In 1899, Santiago Roth described several new genera and species of mammal from Patagonia. These taxa included Polymorphis and its type species P. lechei, Megacrodon and its species M. prolixus and M. planus, and Polyacrodon and its species P. lanciformis and P. ligatus. Polymorphis and Megacrodon were both based on lower jaws with teeth, whereas Polyacrodon was based on upper molars. Roth did not specifically comment on the affinities of Polymorphis or Megacrodon, but suggested that Polyacrodon may have been a predecessor of the toxodonts.

Florentino Ameghino believed that the name Polyacrodon was preoccupied by Polyacrodus, a hybodont shark genus named ten years earlier by Otto Jaekel, and proposed the replacement name Oroacrodon in 1904, viewing P. ligatus as the type species. In the same paper, he established a separate genus, Periacrodon, for Polyacrodon lanciformis. Ameghino classified both Oroacrodon and Periacrodon as phenacodontid condylarths, but noted the similarity between Oroacrodon and macraucheniids, and suggested it was close to the origins of the latter group.

In 1936, George Gaylord Simpson noted that Polyacrodon was not preoccupied by Polyacrodus, making Oroacrodon an unnecessary synonym of it. He also synonymized Periacrodon with Decaconus. In 1948, as part of a review of South American mammal taxonomy, Simpson synonymized Megacrodon and Polymorphis, selecting Polymorphis, which was based on a better type specimen, as the valid name. However, he kept the type species separate as Polymorphis lechei and Polymorphis planus, as he felt he lacked sufficient evidence to synonymize them. Simpson synonymized Trigonostylops wortmani with P. lechei and Didolodus multicuspis with P. planus. He also assigned Lambdaconus alius to Polymorphis as a third species. Simpson suspected that Polyacrodon was synonymous with Polymorphis, but did not formally synonymize the two genera. Simpson classified Polymorphis and Polyacrodon as members of Proterotheriidae.

In 1982 and 1983, Miguel Soria and Richard Cifelli independently concluded that Polymorphis was a macraucheniid, the most basal member of the clade. Cifelli synonymized Polyacrodon and Polymorphis and selected Polymorphis as the valid name, but regarded their type species as probably distinct. Cifelli regarded Polyacrodon planus and Polyacrodon alius as inadequately characterized, but accepted Decaconus as synonymous with Polymorphis. In 1997, McKenna and Bell listed Polyacrodon, Megacrodon, Decaconus, and Periacrodon as synonyms of Polymorphis. In research by Soria posthumously published in 2001, he viewed Megacrodon and Decaconus as didolodontids and Polymorphis as a cramaucheniine macraucheniid.
