= Tricoelodus =

Tricoelodus Temporal range: Late Oligocene (Deseadan) ~28.4–24.0 Ma

Scientific classification
- Kingdom: Animalia
- Phylum: Chordata
- Class: Mammalia
- Order: †Litopterna
- Family: †Adianthidae
- Subfamily: †Adianthinae
- Genus: †Tricoelodus

Type species
- †Tricoelodus bicuspidatus Ameghino, 1897

Species
- †Tricoelodus bicuspidatus Ameghino, 1897; †Tricoelodus boliviensis Cifelli & Soria, 1983

Extinct genus of litopterns

Tricoelodus is an extinct genus of adianthid litopterns that lived during the Late Oligocene in what is now Argentina and Bolivia. Fossils of this genus have been found in the Sarmiento Formation of Argentina and the Salla Formation of Bolivia.

== Naming and classification ==
Tricoelodus was named by Ameghino in 1897.

Tricoelodus was first assigned to Mesorhinidae by Ameghino in 1897. It was then assigned to Adianthinae by Cifelli & Soria in 1983; and to Adianthidae by Cifelli in 1983 and by Carroll in 1988.
