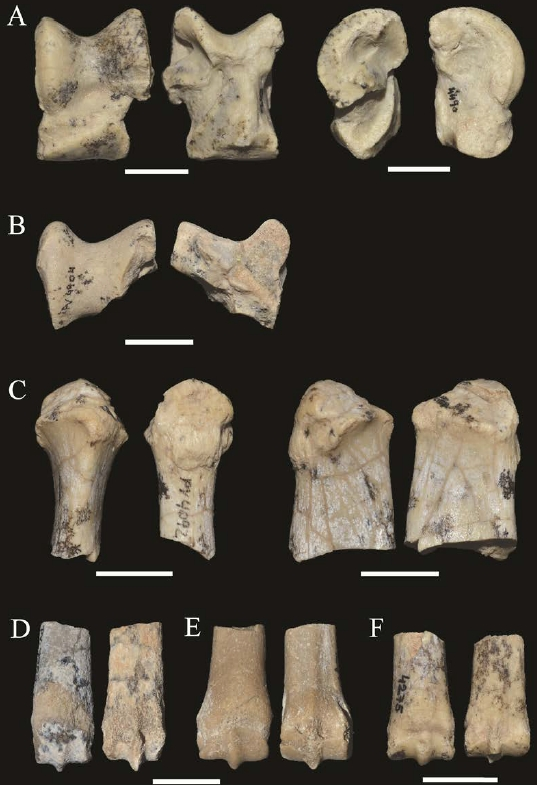
- Astragali of Coniopternium andinum

Scientific classification
- Domain: Eukaryota
- Kingdom: Animalia
- Phylum: Chordata
- Class: Mammalia
- Order: †Litopterna
- Family: †Macraucheniidae
- Subfamily: †Cramaucheniinae
- Genus: †Coniopternium; Ameghino, 1894

Type species
- †Coniopternium andinum Ameghino, 1894

Species
- †C. andinum Ameghino, 1894; †C. primitivum Cifelli and Soria, 1983

Synonyms
- †Notodiaphorus crassus Loomis, 1914

= Coniopternium =

Coniopternium Temporal range: Late Oligocene (Deseadan) ~29.0–23.0 Ma

Extinct genus of litopterns

Coniopternium is an extinct genus of macraucheniids from the Late Oligocene of South America. Fossils of Coniopternium have been found in the Agua de la Piedra, Deseado, and Sarmiento Formations of Argentina, the Salla Formation of Bolivia, and the Moquegua Formation of Peru.

== Taxonomy ==
Coniopternium was first described by Ameghino in 1895 based on fossils found in the Sarmiento Formation of Chubut Province, Argentina. 19 years later, in 1914, the species Notodiaphorus crassus had been described, whose fossils were discovered in the La Flecha locality of the Deseado Formation in Santa Cruz Province. However, later authorities have since synonymized Notodiaphorus with Coniopternium andinum.
