= List of pilosans =

Species in mammal order Pilosa

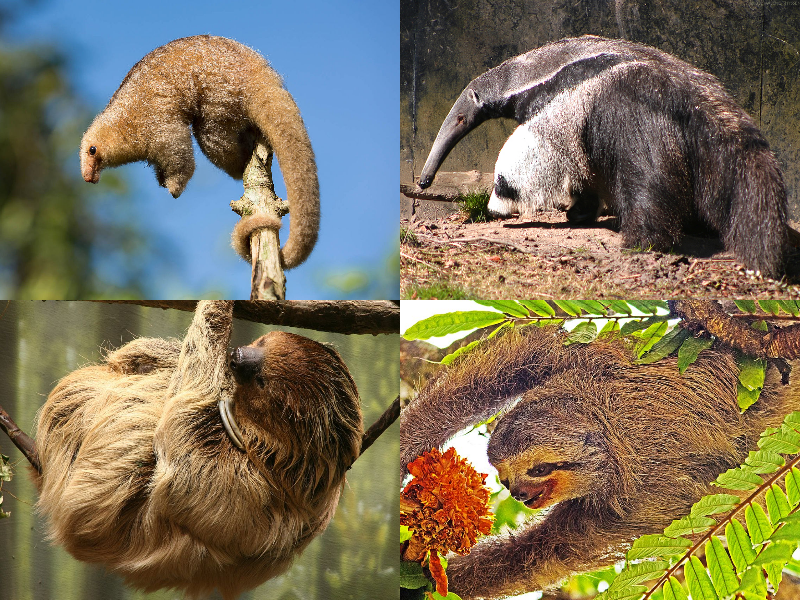
Pilosa species of different families; from top-left, clockwise: silky anteater (Cyclopes didactylus), giant anteater (Myrmecophaga tridactyla), pale-throated sloth (Bradypus tridactylus), Linnaeus's two-toed sloth (Choloepus didactylus)

Pilosa is an order of placental mammals. Members of this order are called pilosans, and include anteaters and sloths. They are found in South and Central America, generally in forests, though some species are found in shrublands, grasslands, and savannas. Pilosans primarily eat insects and leaves. They range in size from the silky anteater, at 36 cm (14 in) plus a 18 cm (7 in) tail, to the giant anteater, at 120 cm (47 in) plus a 90 cm (35 in) tail. No pilosans have population estimates, but the maned sloth is categorized as endangered and the pygmy three-toed sloth is categorized as critically endangered.

The sixteen extant species of Pilosa are divided into two suborders: Folivora, the sloths, and Vermilingua, the anteaters. Folivora contains two families: Bradypodidae, containing four species in one genus; and Choloepodidae, containing two species in one genus. Vermilingua also contains two families: Cyclopedidae, containing seven species in one genus, and Myrmecophagidae, containing three species in two genera. Dozens of extinct prehistoric pilosan species have been discovered, though due to ongoing research and discoveries the exact number and categorization is not fixed.

== Conventions ==
IUCN Red List categories
Conservation status
- EX: Extinct (0 species)
- EW: Extinct in the wild (0 species)
- CR: Critically endangered (1 species)
- EN: Endangered (1 species)
- VU: Vulnerable (1 species)
- NT: Near threatened (0 species)
- LC: Least concern (10 species)

Other categories
- DD: Data deficient (3 species)
- NE: Not evaluated (0 species)

The author citation for the species or genus is given after the scientific name; parentheses around the author citation indicate that this was not the original taxonomic placement. Conservation status codes listed follow the International Union for Conservation of Nature (IUCN) Red List of Threatened Species. Range maps are provided wherever possible; if a range map is not available, a description of the pilosan's range is provided. Ranges are based on the IUCN Red List for that species unless otherwise noted. All extinct species or subspecies listed alongside extant species went extinct after 1500 CE, and are indicated by a dagger symbol "†".

== Classification ==
The order Pilosa consists of ten extant species in two suborders: Folivora, the sloths, and Vermilingua, the anteaters. Folivora contains two families: Bradypodidae, containing four species in one genus; and Choloepodidae, containing two species in one genus. Vermilingua also contains two families: Cyclopedidae, containing a single species, and Myrmecophagidae, containing three species in two genera. Many of these species are further subdivided into subspecies. This does not include hybrid species or extinct prehistoric species.

Suborder Folivora

- Family Bradypodidae
  - Genus Bradypus (three-toed sloths): four species
- Family Choloepodidae
  - Genus Choloepus (two-toed sloths): two species

Suborder Vermilingua

- Family Cyclopedidae
  - Genus Cyclopes (silky anteaters): seven species
- Family Myrmecophagidae
  - Genus Myrmecophaga (giant anteater): one species
  - Genus Tamandua (tamanduas): two species

- Pilosa
  - Folivora
    - Bradypodidae
      - Bradypus
    - Choloepodidae
      - Choloepus
  - Vermilingua
    - Cyclopedidae
      Cyclopes
    - Myrmecophagidae
      - Myrmecophaga
      - Tamandua

== Pilosans ==
The following classification is based on the taxonomy described by the reference work Mammal Species of the World (2005), with augmentation by generally accepted proposals made since using molecular phylogenetic analysis, as supported by both the IUCN and the American Society of Mammalogists.

=== Suborder Folivora ===
==== Bradypodidae ====
Genus Bradypus – Linnaeus, 1758 – four species
Common name	Scientific name and subspecies	Range	Size and ecology	IUCN status and estimated population
Brown-throated sloth	B. variegatus Schinz, 1825 Seven subspecies: B. v. boliviensis; B. v. brasiliensis; B. v. ephippiger; B. v. gorgon; B. v. infuscatus; B. v. trivittatus; B. v. variegatus	Central America and northern South America	Size: 42–80 cm (17–31 in) long, plus 2–9 cm (1–4 in) tail Habitat: Forest Diet: Leaves, flowers, and fruit of Cecropia trees	LC Unknown
Maned sloth	B. torquatus Illiger, 1811	Eastern South America	Size: 45–50 cm (18–20 in) long, plus 4–5 cm (2 in) tail Habitat: Forest Diet: Leaves	EN Unknown
Pale-throated sloth	B. tridactylus Linnaeus, 1758	Northern South America	Size: 45–75 cm (18–30 in) long, plus 4–6 cm (2 in) tail Habitat: Forest Diet: Twigs, buds, and leaves of Cecropia trees	LC Unknown
Pygmy three-toed sloth	B. pygmaeus Anderson, Handley, 2001	Isla Escudo de Veraguas in Panama	Size: 48–53 cm (19–21 in) long, plus 4–6 cm (2 in) tail Habitat: Forest Diet: Leaves	CR Unknown

==== Choloepodidae ====
Genus Choloepus – Illiger, 1811 – two species
Common name	Scientific name and subspecies	Range	Size and ecology	IUCN status and estimated population
Hoffmann's two-toed sloth	C. hoffmanni Peters, 1858 Five subspecies: C. h. capitalis; C. h. florenciae; C. h. hoffmanni; C. h. juruanus; C. h. pallescens	Central America and northern and western South America	Size: 54–72 cm (21–28 in) long, plus 1–3 cm (1 in) tail Habitat: Forest, shrubland, and grassland Diet: Leaves, as well as buds, twigs, shoots, fruits, and flowers	LC Unknown
Linnaeus's two-toed sloth	C. didactylus (Linnaeus, 1758)	Northern South America	Size: 60–86 cm (24–34 in) long, plus 1–2 cm (1 in) tail Habitat: Forest Diet: Berries, leaves, small twigs, and fruit, as well as insects	LC Unknown

=== Suborder Vermilingua ===
==== Cyclopedidae ====
Genus Cyclopes – Gray, 1821 – seven species
Common name	Scientific name and subspecies	Range	Size and ecology	IUCN status and estimated population
Amboro silky anteater	C. catellus Thomas, 1928	Bolivia (in red)	Size: Unknown Habitat: Forest Diet: Ants and termites	DD Unknown
Central American silky anteater	C. dorsalis (Gray, 1865)	Central America and northwestern South America (in orange)	Size: 18–21 cm (7–8 in) long, plus 17–22 cm (7–9 in) tail Habitat: Forest Diet: Ants and termites	LC Unknown
Common silky anteater	C. didactylus (Linnaeus, 1758)	Northern and eastern South America (in green)	Size: About 20 cm (8 in) long, plus 16–29 cm (6–11 in) tail Habitat: Forest Diet: Ants and termites	LC Unknown
Red silky anteater	C. rufus Miranda, Casali, Perini, Machado, & Santos, 2017	Western South America (in yellow)	Size: Unknown Habitat: Forest Diet: Ants and termites	LC Unknown
Rio Negro silky anteater	C. ida Thomas, 1900	Northwestern South America (in brown)	Size: Unknown Habitat: Forest Diet: Ants and termites	DD Unknown
Thomas's silky anteater	C. thomasi Miranda, Casali, Perini, Machado, & Santos, 2017	Western South America (in blue)	Size: Unknown Habitat: Forest Diet: Ants and termites	DD Unknown
Xingu silky anteater	C. xinguensis Miranda, Casali, Perini, Machado, & Santos, 2017	Central Brazil (in purple)	Size: Unknown Habitat: Forest Diet: Ants and termites	LC Unknown

==== Myrmecophagidae ====
Genus Myrmecophaga – Linnaeus, 1758 – one species
Common name	Scientific name and subspecies	Range	Size and ecology	IUCN status and estimated population
Giant anteater	M. tridactyla Linnaeus, 1758 Three subspecies: M. t. artata; M. t. centralis; M. t. tridactyla	Central America and South America (former range in red)	Size: 100–120 cm (39–47 in) long, plus 65–90 cm (26–35 in) tail Habitat: Forest, savanna, shrubland, and grassland Diet: Ants, termites, and soft-bodied grubs	VU Unknown

Genus Tamandua – Gray, 1825 – two species
Common name	Scientific name and subspecies	Range	Size and ecology	IUCN status and estimated population
Northern tamandua	T. mexicana (Saussure, 1860) Four subspecies: T. m. instabilis; T. m. mexicana; T. m. opistholeuca; T. m. punensis	Central America and northern South America	Size: 47–77 cm (19–30 in) long, plus 40–68 cm (16–27 in) tail Habitat: Forest and savanna Diet: Ants and termites	LC Unknown
Southern tamandua	T. tetradactyla (Linnaeus, 1758) Four subspecies: T. t. nigra; T. t. quichua; T. t. straminea; T. t. tetradactyla	South America	Size: 53–88 cm (21–35 in) long, plus 40–59 cm (16–23 in) tail Habitat: Forest, savanna, and shrubland Diet: Ants and termites, as well as bees and honey	LC Unknown

== Sources ==
- Chernasky, Amy; Motis, Anna; Burgin, Connor, eds. (2023). All the Mammals of the World. Lynx Nature Books. ISBN 978-84-16728-66-4.
- Eisenberg, John F.; Redford, Kent H.; Reid, Fiona; Bonner, Sigrid James (1989). Mammals of the Neotropics. Vol. 3: Ecuador, Bolivia, Brazil. University of Chicago Press. ISBN 978-0-226-19542-1.
- Gardner, Alfred L. (2005). Wilson, Don E.; Reeder, DeeAnn M. (eds.). Mammal Species of the World. Vol. 1 (3rd ed.). Johns Hopkins University Press. ISBN 978-0-8018-8221-0.
