= Anteater (disambiguation) =

"Anteater" properly refers to the four species of xenarthran placental mammals of the suborder Vermilingua native to Mexico, Central America, and tropical South America. This includes the giant anteater, the silky anteater, the northern tamandua, and the southern tamandua.

Anteater can also refer to any of several unrelated species which have independently and convergently adapted to fill the same niche of eating ants or termites:

- Pangolin (scaly anteater), boreoeutherian placental mammals found in tropical regions of Africa and Asia
- Aardvark (Cape anteater), a medium-sized afrotherian placental mammal native to Africa
- Numbat (banded anteater), a small marsupial endemic to western Australia
- Echidna (spiny anteater), a family of monotremes native to New Guinea and Australia

== Other uses ==
- AnteAter, an electronica side-project of ¡Forward, Russia! singer Tom Woodhead
- Ant-eater, B.C. (comic strip) character
- Anteater (video game), a 1982 arcade game
- UC Irvine Anteaters, the sports teams of the University of California, Irvine
- Kenworth T600, semi-trailer truck with a design that gives it this nickname
- Anteater, an error code in Destiny 2
