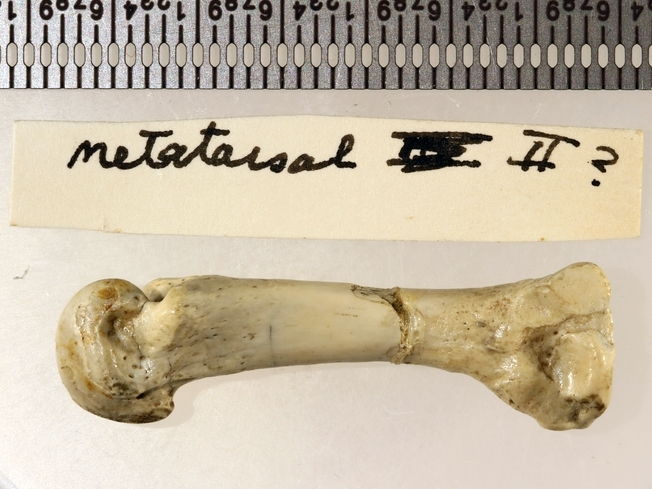

Scientific classification
- Kingdom: Animalia
- Phylum: Chordata
- Class: Mammalia
- Order: Pilosa
- Family: Myrmecophagidae
- Genus: †Neotamandua
- Species: †N. borealis

Binomial name
- †Neotamandua borealis Hirschfeld, 1976

= Neotamandua borealis =

Neotamandua borealis Temporal range: Mid Miocene (Laventan) ~13.8–11.8 Ma

Extinct species of mammal

Neotamandua borealis is an extinct species of anteater. Fossils were found in the Honda Group at the Konzentrat-Lagerstätte of La Venta, Colombia. It was suggested to be an ancestor of the giant anteater, and is also related to the tamanduas. The species was described by Hirschfeld in 1976.

== Description ==
Neotamandua borealis foraged on social insects such as ants and termites. It was both arboreal and terrestrial. It weighed between 10 and 100 kilograms (22 and 220 lb).
