= Antbear =

Antbear or ant bear may refer to:

- Aardvark, an animal of Africa
- Giant anteater, an animal of South America
- Pangolin, an animal of Africa and south Asia
