= Red silky anteater =

Conservation status
- Least Concern (IUCN 3.1)

Scientific classification
- Kingdom: Animalia
- Phylum: Chordata
- Class: Mammalia
- Order: Pilosa
- Family: Cyclopedidae
- Genus: Cyclopes
- Species: C. rufus

Binomial name
- Cyclopes rufus Miranda, Casali, Perini, Machado & Santos, 2018
- Cyclopes distribution C. rufus in red

Species of mammal

The red silky anteater is a species of anteater found in the western Amazon Basin of Brazil and possibly in Peru and Bolivia.
