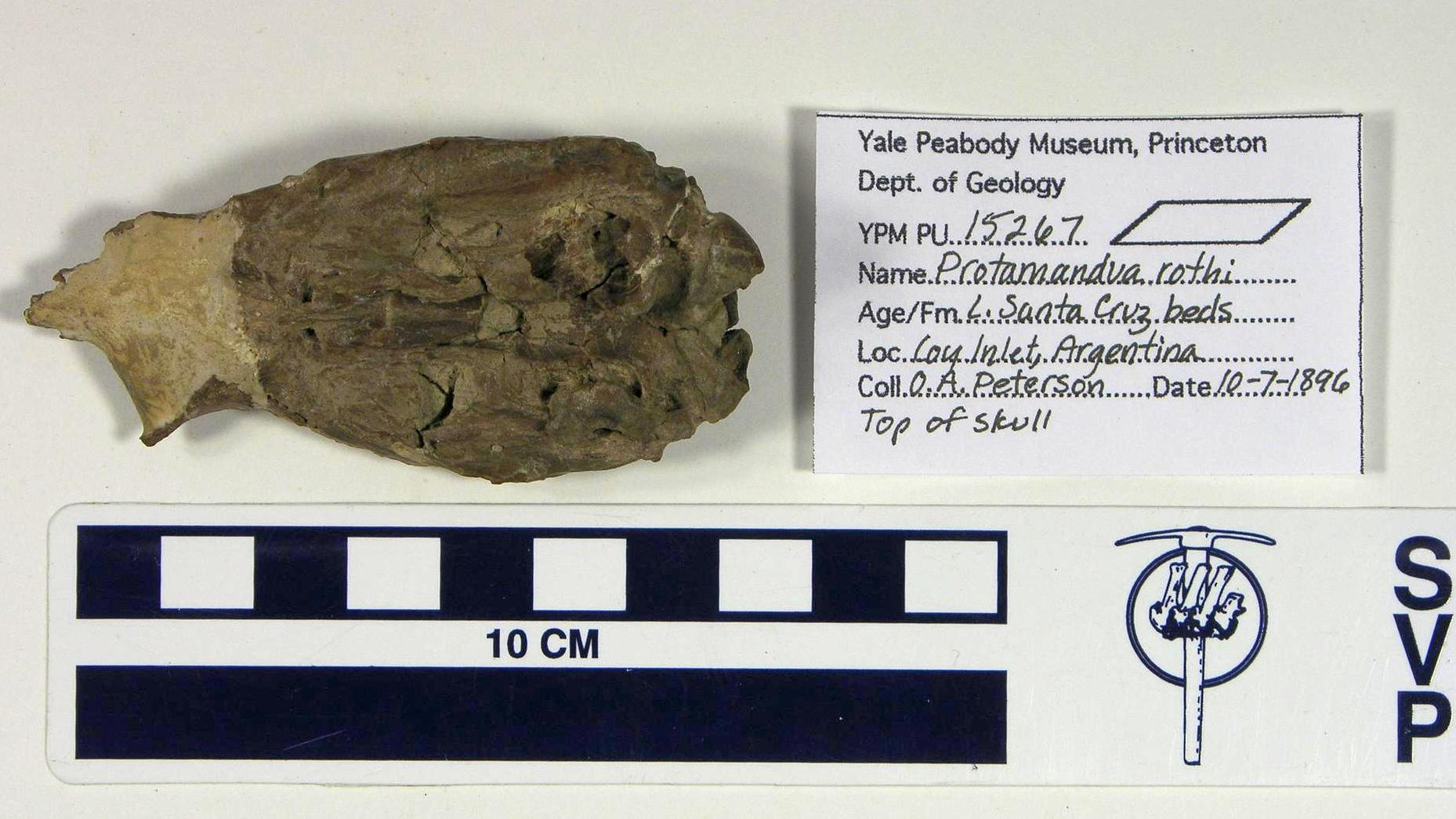
- Skull fragment

Scientific classification
- Kingdom: Animalia
- Phylum: Chordata
- Class: Mammalia
- Infraclass: Placentalia
- Order: Pilosa
- Family: Myrmecophagidae
- Genus: †Protamandua; Ameghino, 1904

Type species
- Protamandua rothi Ameghino, 1904

= Protamandua =

Protamandua Temporal range: Early-Mid Miocene (Santacrucian-Mayoan) ~17.5–11.6 Ma

Extinct genus of mammals

Protamandua is an extinct genus of anteaters. Its closest living relatives are the giant anteater (Myrmecophaga tridactyla) and tamanduas (genus Tamandua). Fossils of Protamandua are restricted to the Santa Cruz Formation of Argentina. It may have been a common ancestor of Myrmecophaga and Tamandua.
