= Central American silky anteater =

Conservation status
- Least Concern (IUCN 3.1)

Scientific classification
- Kingdom: Animalia
- Phylum: Chordata
- Class: Mammalia
- Order: Pilosa
- Family: Cyclopedidae
- Genus: Cyclopes
- Species: C. dorsalis

Binomial name
- Cyclopes dorsalis (J. E. Gray, 1865)
- Cyclopes distribution C. dorsalis in orange

Synonyms
- Cyclopes didactylus dorsalis (J. E. Gray, 1865)

Species of mammal

The Central American silky anteater (Cyclopes dorsalis) is a species of anteater. It was formerly considered a subspecies of the silky anteater (Cyclopes didactylus).

== Taxonomy ==
The Central American silky anteater was first described in 1865 by British zoologist John Edward Gray. He placed it in the now-defunct genus Cyclothurus with a scientific name of Cyclothurus dorsalis. The holotype had been collected in Costa Rica. In 1899, Édouard Louis Trouessart published that it should instead be characterized as a subspecies of the silky anteater, listing it as Cycloturus [sic] didactylus var. dorsalis. The taxa were later moved to the older genus name Cyclopes.

For most of the taxonomic history of the genus Cyclopes, scientists believed that its only member was the silky anteater (C. didactylus). A 2018 publication supported the idea that there were at least seven species of silky anteater based on genetic and morphological differences. The authors elevated C. dorsalis from subspecies to species rank.

== Range ==
The Central American silky anteater is found in Mexico; Central America, including Belize, Panama, Costa Rica, Guatemala, Honduras, and Nicaragua; and South America, including Colombia, Ecuador, and Venezuela.
