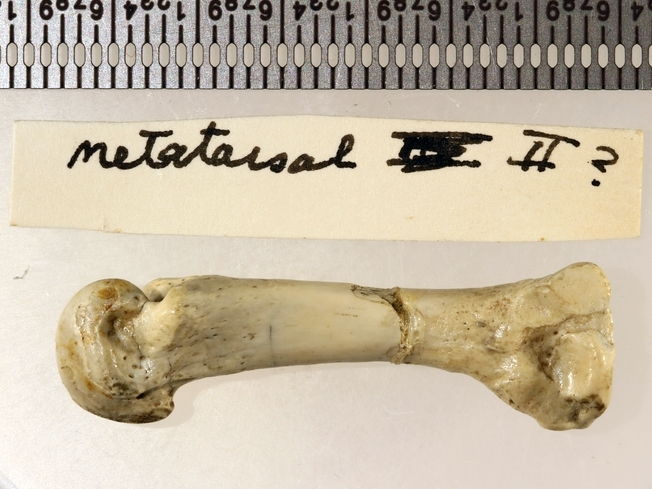

Scientific classification
- Kingdom: Animalia
- Phylum: Chordata
- Class: Mammalia
- Order: Pilosa
- Family: Myrmecophagidae
- Genus: †Neotamandua; Rovereto 1914

Species
- N. borealis Hirschfeld 1976; N. conspicua Rovereto 1914; N. greslebini Kraglievich 1940; N. magna Ameghino 1919

= Neotamandua =

Neotamandua Temporal range: Mid Miocene-Late Pliocene (Laventan-Chapadmalalan) ~13.8–3.0 Ma

Extinct genus of mammals

Neotamandua is an extinct genus of anteaters that lived in the Miocene to Pliocene in South America.

== Taxonomy ==
Their fossils have been found in the Miocene Collón Cura Formation of Argentina, the Honda Group at La Venta in Colombia and the Pliocene Araucano Formation in Argentina. Its closest living relatives are the giant anteater (Myrmecophaga tridactyla) and tamanduas (genus Tamandua). The species Neotamandua borealis was suggested to be an ancestor of the giant anteater. Patterson (1992) suggested the Neotamandua fossils are very similar to Myrmecophaga, which would mean Neotamandua may be congeneric with Myrmecophaga.
