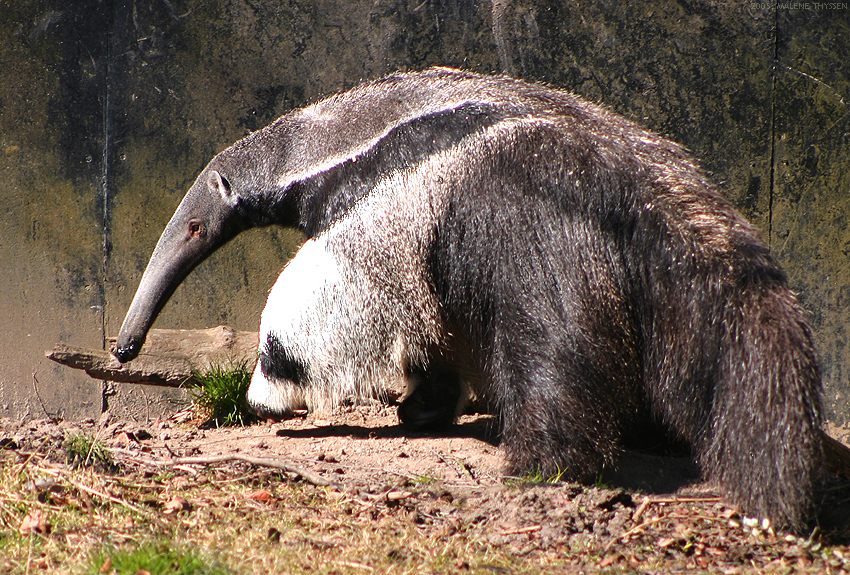
- Myrmecophaga tridactyla (giant anteater)

Scientific classification
- Kingdom: Animalia
- Phylum: Chordata
- Class: Mammalia
- Order: Pilosa
- Suborder: Vermilingua
- Family: Myrmecophagidae; Gray, 1825

Type genus
- Myrmecophaga Linnaeus, 1758

Genera
- Myrmecophaga; Tamandua †Neotamandua †Protamandua
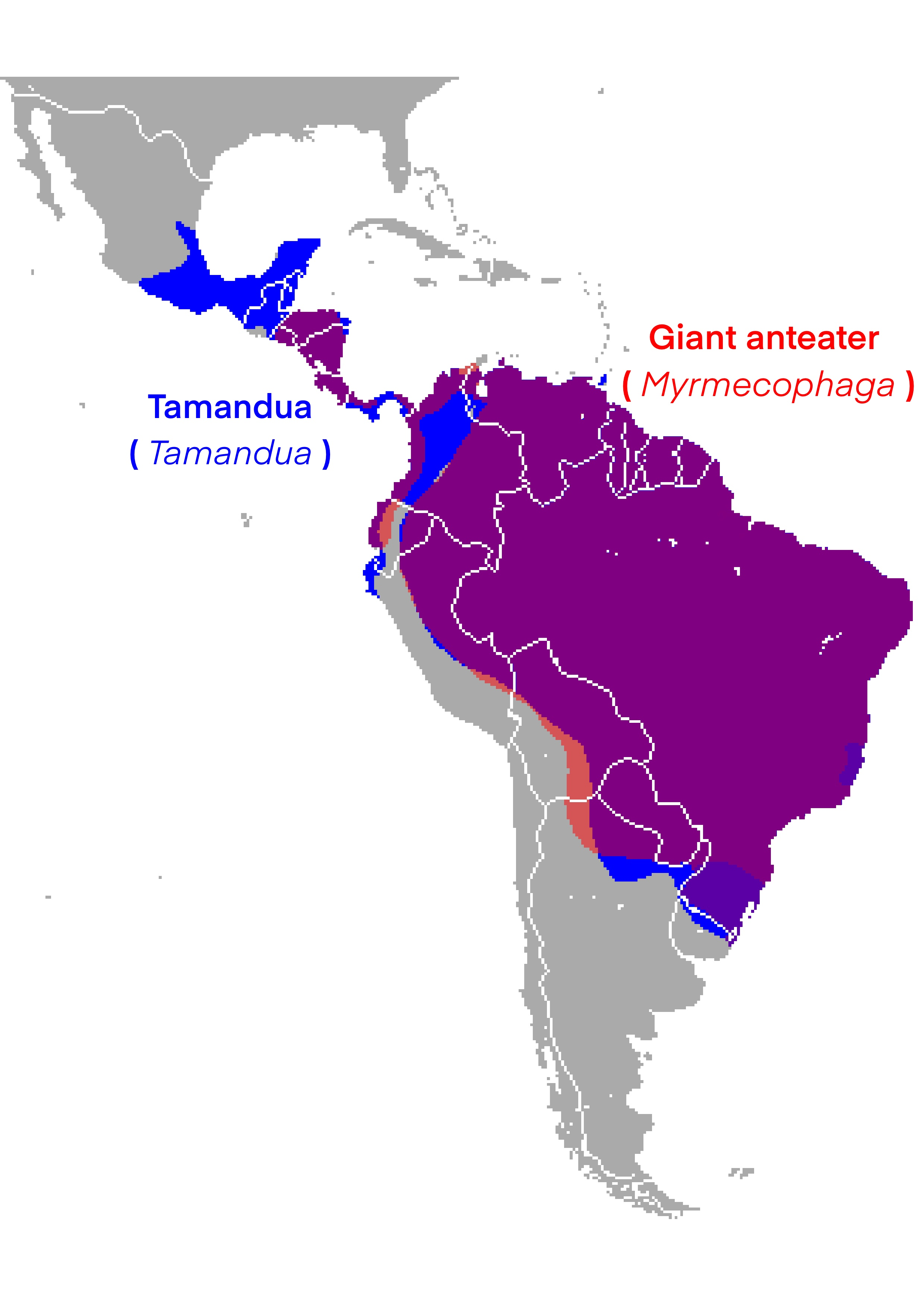

= Myrmecophagidae =

Myrmecophagidae Temporal range: Early Miocene–Recent

Family of mammals

The Myrmecophagidae are a family of anteaters. Two genera and three species are in the family, consisting of the giant anteater, and the tamanduas. The fossil Eurotamandua from the Messel Pit in Germany may be an early anteater, but its status is currently debated. The name is derived from the Ancient Greek words μύρμηξ (múrmēx), meaning "ant", and φάγος (phágos), meaning "eater".

== Characteristics ==
Myrmecophagids are medium to large animals, with distinctively elongated snouts and long, narrow tongues. They have powerful claws on their toes, enabling them to rip open termite mounds and ant nests to eat the insects inside. They have no teeth, but produce a large amount of sticky saliva to trap the insects, as well as backward-pointing spines on their tongues. Ants and termites are almost their only food in the wild, and their primary source of water, although they sometimes also drink free-standing water, and occasionally eat fruits.

== Distribution ==
Myrmecophagids are found in Central and South America, from southern Belize and Guatemala to northern Argentina.

== Reproduction ==
Most myrmecophagids are solitary, meeting only to mate. Myrmecophagids are polygamous and the male generally has no role in caring for the young. The male silky anteater is an exception and helps to feed its young. The gestation period of myrmecophagids ranges from 120 to 190 days. Myrmecophagids typically give birth to one offspring at a time, and the cub lives on its mothers back for 6–9 months after it is born. Myrmecophagids have such sharp claws that they cannot touch their young without causing injury.

== Evolutionary history ==
Myrmecophagids belong to the Xenarthra, formerly known as Edentata, which also includes sloths and armadillos. Edentates (meaning without teeth) diverged from insectivores during the Cretaceous period, roughly 135 million years ago. The fossil record of the family Myrmecophagidae dates to the Early Miocene in South America, roughly 25 million years ago. Throughout their evolutionary history, myrmecophagids have maintained a narrow range, though at one point their range may have extended to northern Mexico.

Myrmecophagidae consists of at least five genera and 11 nominal species, including: Protamandua rothi†; Neotamandua? australis†; Neotamandua borealis†; Gen. et sp. nov. †; 'Neotamandua' magna†; Neotamandua greslebini†; Neotamandua conspicua†; Myrmecophaga caroloameghinoi†; Myrmecophaga tridactyla; Tamandua tetradactyla; and Tamandua Mexicana.

== Taxonomy ==
- Order: Pilosa
  - Suborder: Folivora
  - Suborder: Vermilingua
    - Family: Cyclopedidae
      - Genus: Cyclopes
        - Species: Cyclopes didactylus – silky anteater
    - Family: Myrmecophagidae
      - Genus: Protamandua †
      - Genus: Myrmecophaga
        - Species: Myrmecophaga tridactyla – giant anteater
      - Genus: Neotamandua †
      - Genus: Tamandua
        - Species: Tamandua mexicana – northern tamandua
        - Species: Tamandua tetradactyla – southern tamandua
