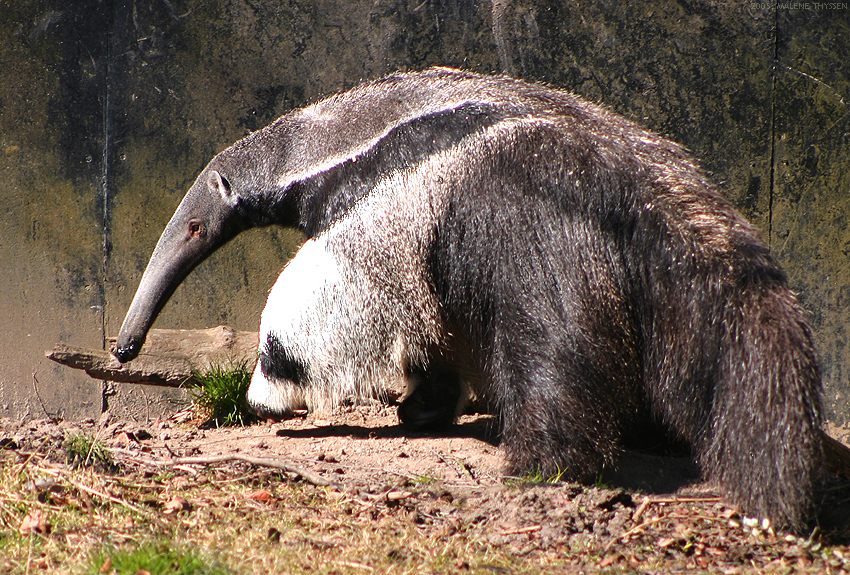
- A giant anteater at Copenhagen Zoo, Denmark, 2005

Conservation status
- Vulnerable (IUCN 3.1)
- CITES Appendix II

Scientific classification
- Kingdom: Animalia
- Phylum: Chordata
- Class: Mammalia
- Order: Pilosa
- Family: Myrmecophagidae
- Genus: Myrmecophaga; Linnaeus, 1758
- Species: M. tridactyla

Binomial name
- Myrmecophaga tridactyla Linnaeus, 1758
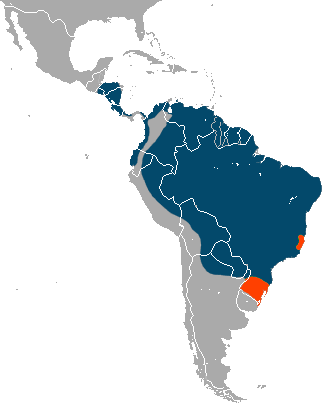
- Range extant possibly extinct

Synonyms
- Myrmecophaga jubata Linnaeus, 1766; Falcifer Rehn, 1900

= Giant anteater =

Giant anteater Temporal range: Montehermosan–Recent ~5–0 Ma

Species of mammal

The giant anteater (Myrmecophaga tridactyla) is a large insectivorous mammal native to Central and South America. It is the largest of the four living species of anteaters, which are classified with sloths in the order Pilosa. The only extant member of the genus Myrmecophaga, the giant anteater is mostly terrestrial, in contrast to other living anteaters and sloths, which are arboreal or semiarboreal. It is recognizable by its elongated snout, bushy tail, long foreclaws, and distinctively colored fur.

The giant anteater is found in multiple habitats, including grassland and rainforest. It forages in open areas and rests in more forested habitats. It feeds primarily on ants and termites, using its foreclaws to dig them up and its long, sticky tongue to collect them. Though giant anteaters live in overlapping home ranges, they are mostly solitary except during mother-offspring relationships, aggressive interactions between males, and when mating. Mother anteaters carry their offspring on their backs until weaning them.

The giant anteater is listed as vulnerable by the International Union for Conservation of Nature. It has been extirpated from many parts of its former range. Threats to its survival include habitat destruction, fire, and poaching for fur and bushmeat, although some anteaters inhabit protected areas. With its distinctive appearance and habits, the anteater has been featured in pre-Columbian cultural narratives.

== Taxonomy ==
The giant anteater got its binomial name from Carl Linnaeus in 1758. Its generic name, Myrmecophaga, and specific name, tridactyla, are both Greek, meaning "anteater" and "three fingers", respectively. Myrmecophaga jubata was used as a synonym. Three subspecies have been suggested: M. t. tridactyla (Venezuela and the Guianas south to northern Argentina), M. t. centralis (Central America to northwestern Colombia and northern Ecuador), and M. t. artata (northeastern Colombia and northwestern Venezuela). The giant anteater is grouped with the semiarboreal northern and southern tamanduas in the family Myrmecophagidae. Together with the family Cyclopedidae, whose only extant member is the arboreal silky anteater, the two families comprise the suborder Vermilingua.

Anteaters and sloths belong to the order Pilosa and share the superorder Xenarthra with the Cingulata (whose only extant members are armadillos). The two orders of Xenarthra split 65 million years ago (Mya) during the Late Cretaceous epoch. Anteaters and sloths diverged around 58 Mya, during the Paleocene epoch. The lineages of Cyclopes and other extant anteaters split around 40 Mya in the Eocene epoch, while the last common ancestor of Myrmecophaga and Tamandua existed circa 13 Mya in the Miocene epoch. Through most of their evolutionary history, anteaters were confined to South America, which was formerly an island continent. Following the formation of the Isthmus of Panama about 3 Mya, anteaters of all three extant genera invaded Central America as part of the Great American Interchange.

The following cladogram is based on a genetic study by Delsuc and colleagues (2012).

- Xenarthra
  - Pilosa
    - Sloths
      - Bradypus
      - Choloepus
    - Anteaters
      - Cyclopes
      - - Tamandua
        - Myrmecophaga
  - Armadillos
    - Dasypus
    - - - Euphractus
        - - Chaetophractus
          - Zaedyus
      - - Calyptophractus
        - Chlamyphorus
      - - Priodontes
        - - Cabassous
          - Tolypeutes

The fossil record for anteaters is generally sparse. Known fossils include the Pliocene genus Palaeomyrmidon, a close relative to the silky anteater, Protamandua, which is closer to the giant anteater and the tamanduas from the Miocene, and Neotamandua, which is believed to have close affinities to Myrmecophaga. Protamandua was larger than the silky anteater but smaller than a tamandua, while Neotamandua was larger, falling somewhere between a tamandua and a giant anteater. Protamandua did not appear to be specialized for walking or climbing, but it may have had a prehensile tail. Neotamandua, though, is unlikely to have had a prehensile tail, and its feet were similar in form to both the tamanduas and the giant anteater. The species Neotamandua borealis was suggested to be an ancestor of the latter. Another member of the genus Myrmecophaga has been recovered from the Montehermosan Monte Hermoso Formation in Argentina and was described by Kraglievitch in 1934 as Nunezia caroloameghinoi. The species was reclassified as Myrmecophaga caroloameghinoi by S. E. Hirschfeld in 1976.

The giant anteater is the most terrestrial of the living anteater species; specialization for life on the ground appears to be a new trait in anteater evolution. The transition to life on the ground could have been aided by the expansion of open habitats such as savanna in South America and the abundance of native colonial insects, such as termites, that provided a larger potential food source. Both the giant anteater and the southern tamandua are well represented in the fossil record of the late Pleistocene and early Holocene.

== Characteristics ==
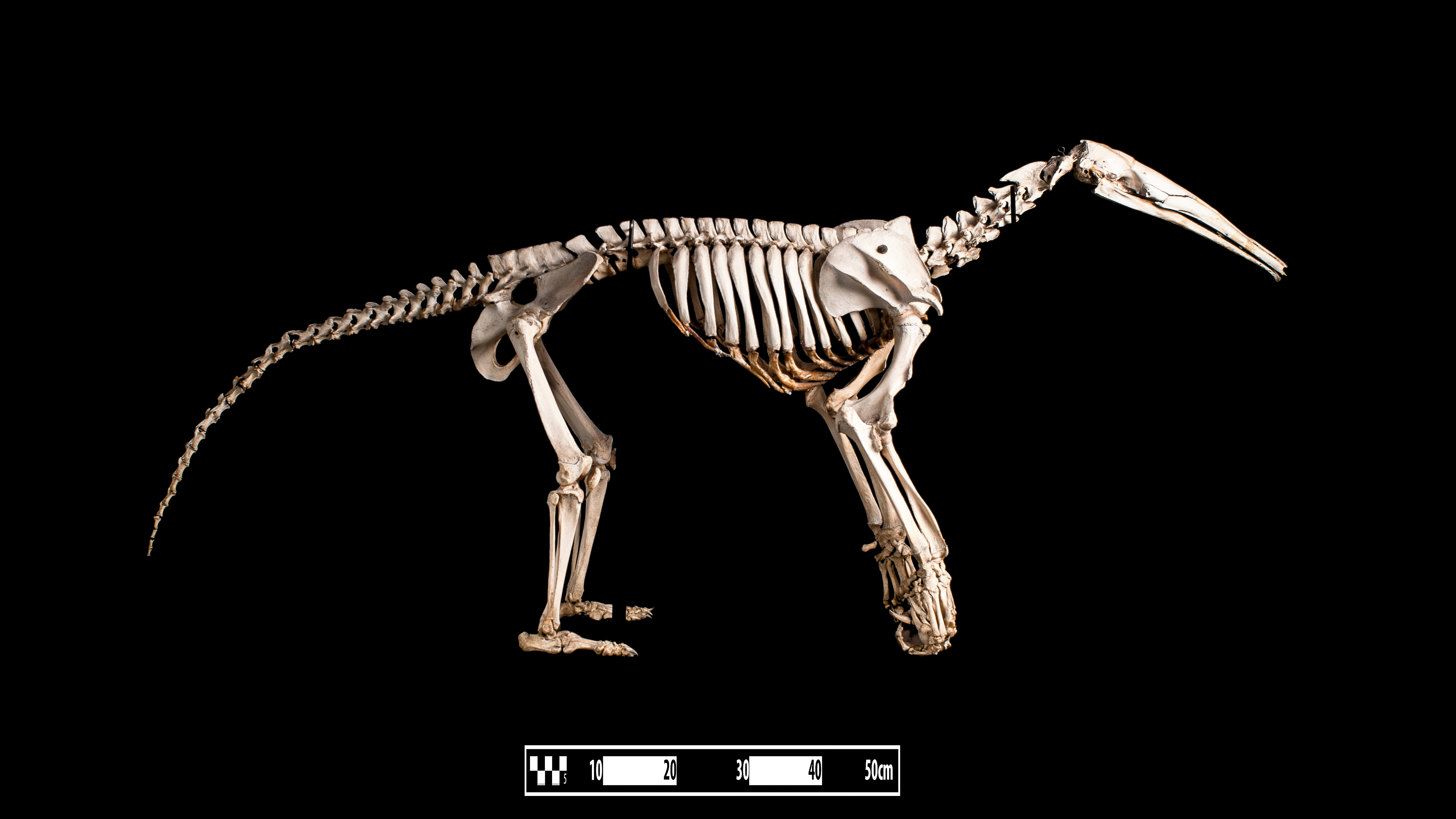
Skeleton

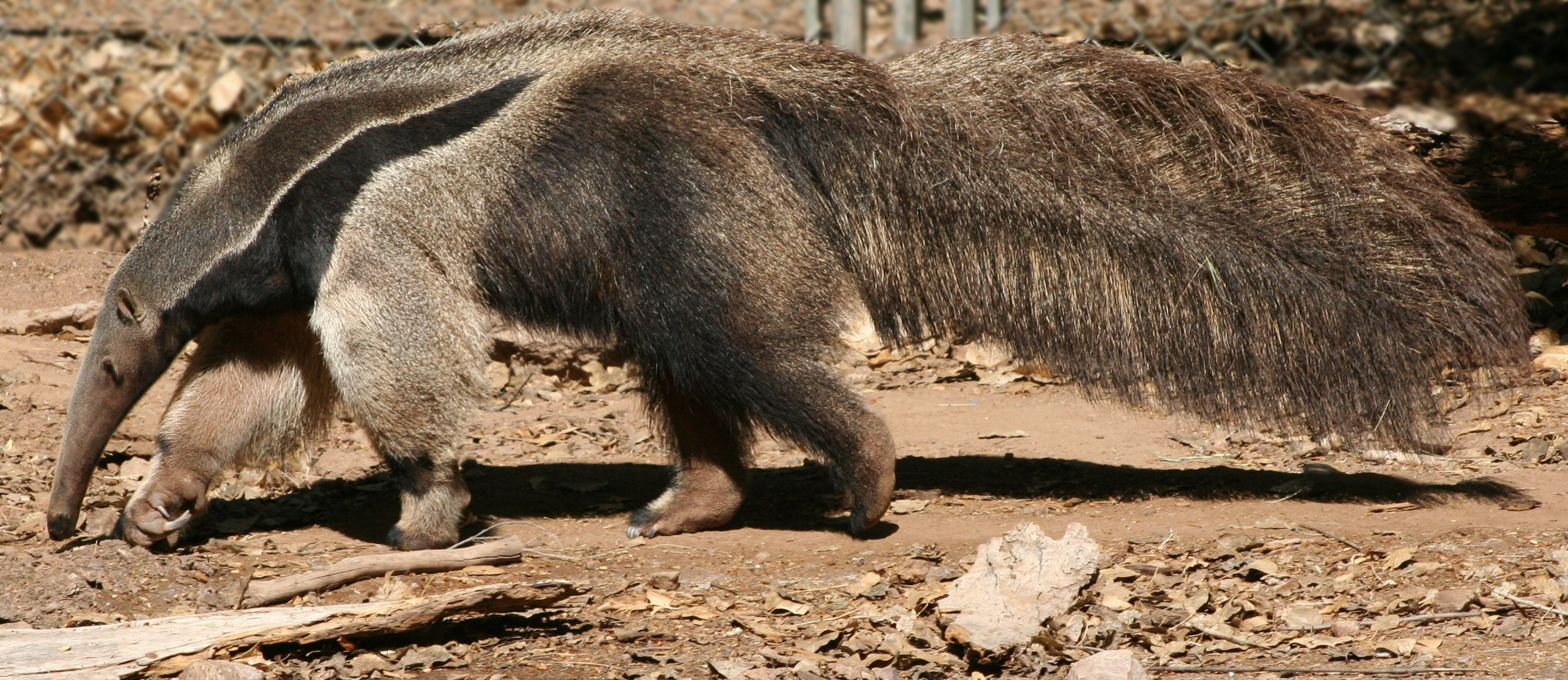
Side view

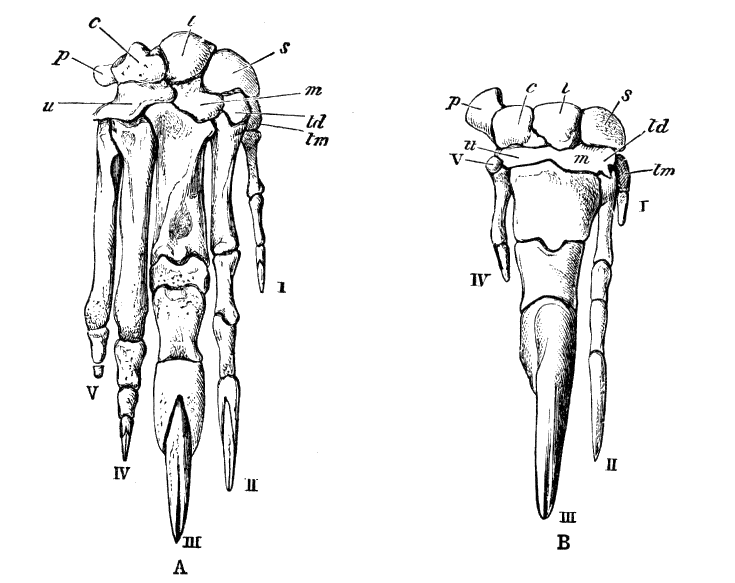
Hind foot (left) and front foot (right)

The giant anteater can be identified by its large size, long, narrow muzzle, and long, bushy tail. It has a total body length of 182 to 217 cm (72 to 85 in). Males weigh 33 to 50 kg (73 to 110 lb), and females weigh 27 to 47 kg (60 to 104 lb), making the giant anteater the biggest extant species in its suborder. The head of the giant anteater, at 30 cm (12 in) long, is particularly elongated, even when compared to other anteaters. Its cylindrical snout takes up most of its head. Its eyes, ears, and mouth are relatively small. It has poor eyesight but has a powerful sense of smell, 40 times that of a human. While there is some difference in size and shape between the sexes, males being larger and more robust, telling them apart from a distance can be difficult. The male's genitals are located within its body, and its urogenital opening is smaller and farther from the anus than the female's. The female's two mammary glands are located between the front legs.

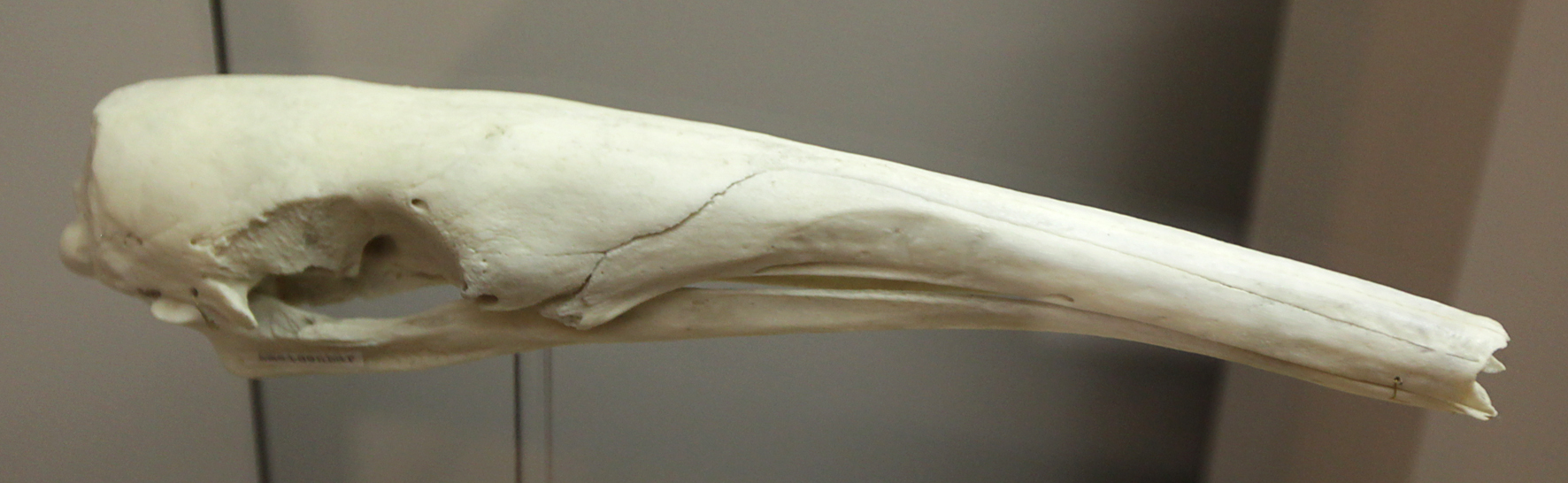
Skull

Even for an anteater, the neck is especially thick compared to the back of the head, and a small hump protrudes behind it. The coat is mostly grayish brown or black with mottled white. They have white front legs with black-ringed wrists and hands, dark hind legs, and a brown tail. From the throat to the shoulders is a thick black mark with white outlines and sharp tips. The coat hairs are long, especially on the tail, which makes the appendage look larger than it actually is. An erect mane stretches along the back. The bold pattern was thought to be disruptive camouflage, but a 2009 study suggests it is warning coloration.

The giant anteater has broad ribs and five toes on each foot. Three toes on the front feet have claws, which are particularly large on the third digits. It walks on its front knuckles, similar to gorillas and chimpanzees. This allows the giant anteater to walk without scraping its claws on the ground. The middle digits, which support most of its weight, have long knuckle joints and bent finger joints. Unlike the front feet, the hind feet have short claws on all five toes and walk plantigrade (relatively flat). As a "hook-and-pull" digger, the giant anteater has a large supraspinous fossa (depression in the back of the shoulder blade), which gives the teres major (in the upper back and shoulder) more leverage—increasing the front limbs' pulling power—and the triceps muscle helps control the thickened middle digit.

The giant anteater has a low body temperature for a mammal, about 33 °C (91 °F), a few degrees lower than a typical mammalian temperature of 36 to 38 °C (97 to 100 °F). Xenarthrans in general tend to have lower metabolic rates than most other mammals, a trend thought to correlate with their dietary specializations and low mobility.

=== Feeding anatomy ===
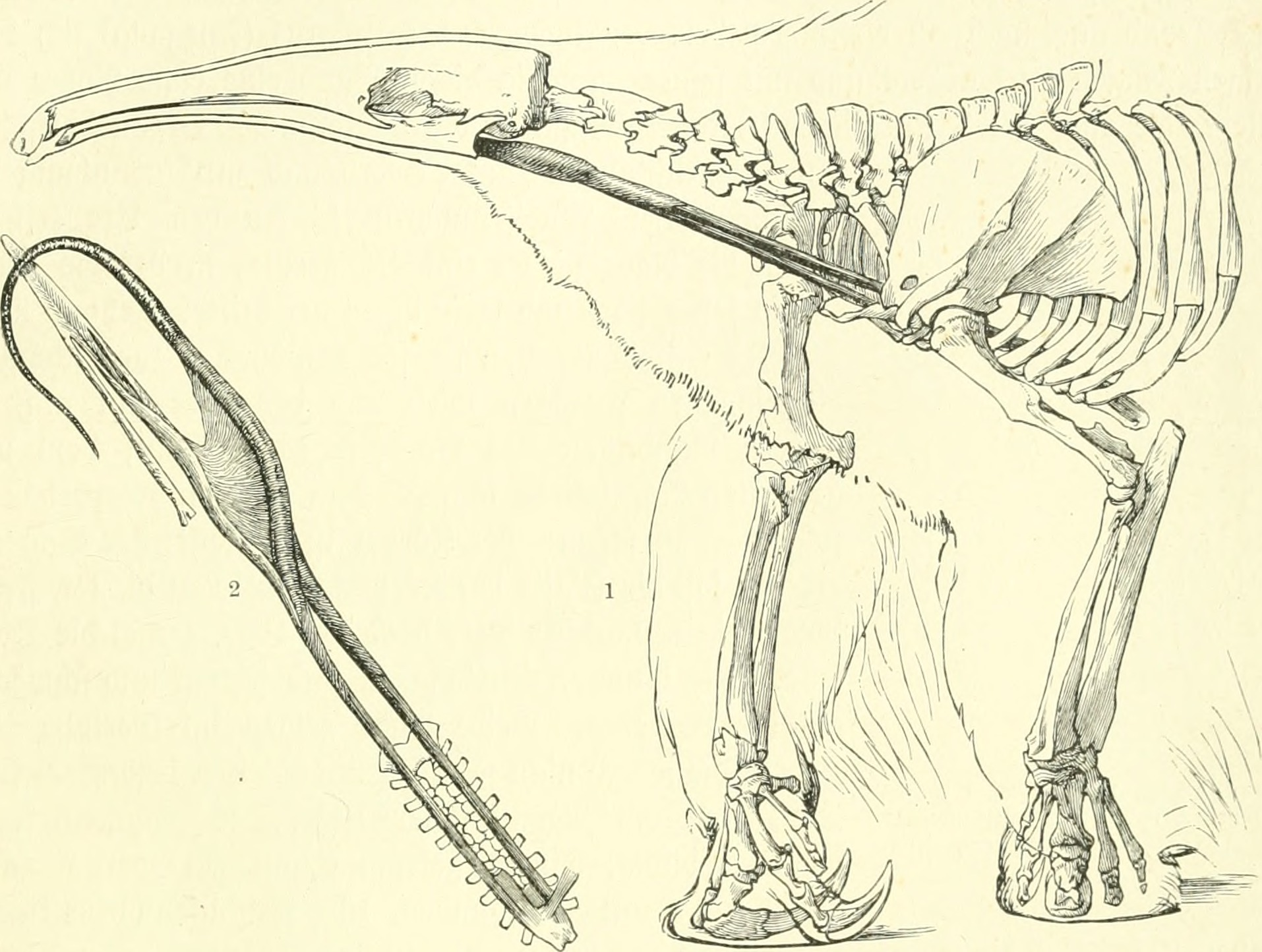
Giant anteater tongue anatomy

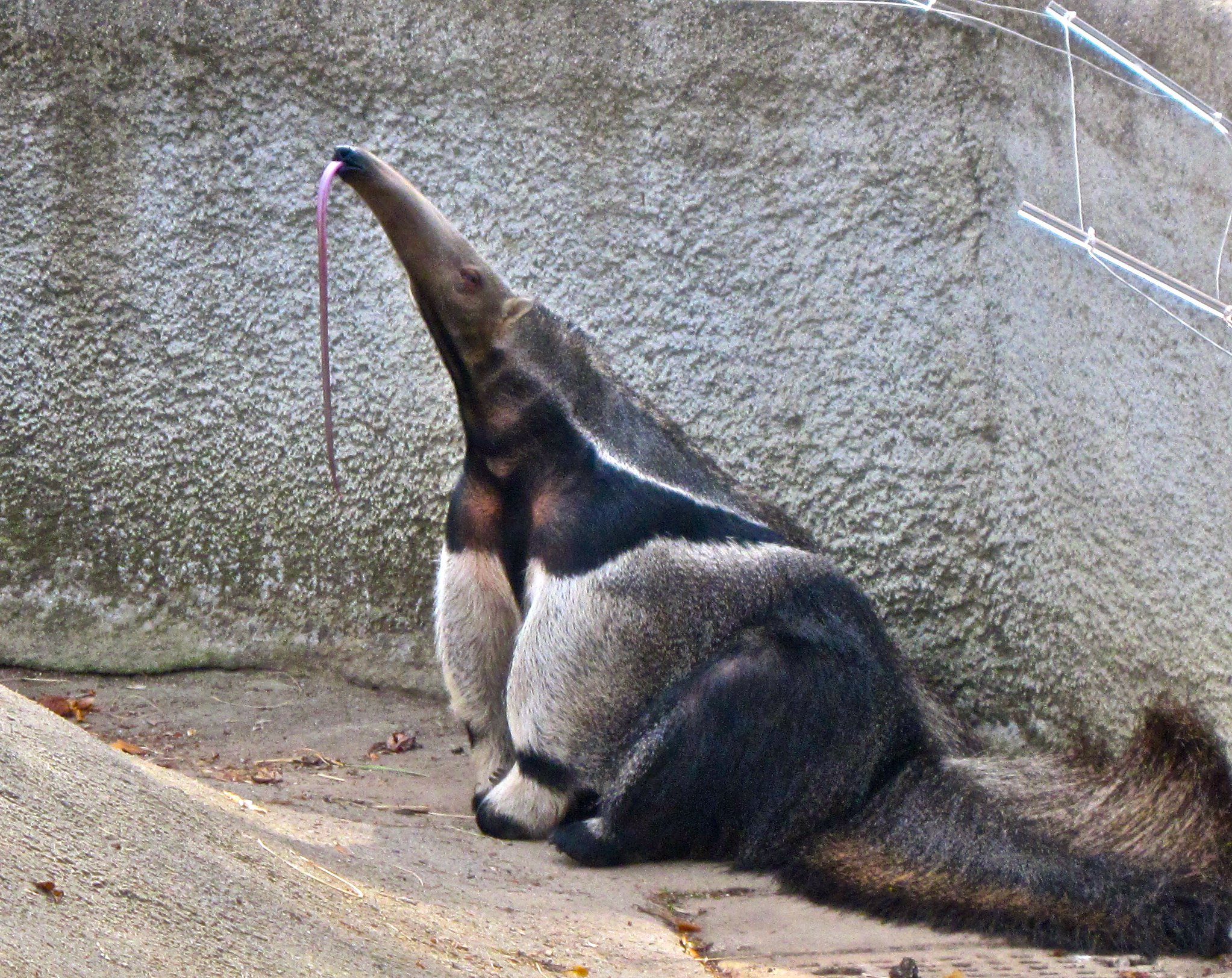
A giant anteater with its tongue extended

The giant anteater has no teeth and is capable of very limited jaw movement. It relies on the rotation of the two halves of its lower jaw, held together by a ligament connecting the jaw hinges or rami, to open and close its mouth. This is accomplished by its chewing muscles, which are relatively underdeveloped. Jaw depression creates an oral opening large enough for the slender tongue to flick out. It has a length of around 60 cm (24 in) and is more triangular in the back but becomes more rounded towards the front and ends in a rounded tip. The tongue has backward-curving taste buds and is extremely moist due to the large salivary glands.

The tongue can only move forwards and backwards due to the tiny mouth and shape of the snout. During feeding, the animal relies on the direction of its head for aim. When fully extended, the tongue reaches 45 cm (18 in) and can move in and out around 160 times per minute (nearly three times per second). A unique sternoglossus muscle, a combination of the sternohyoid (a neck muscle) and the hyoglossus (a tongue muscle), anchors the tongue directly to the sternum. The hyoid bone is large, V-shaped, and flexible and supports the tongue as it moves. The buccinator (cheek) muscles loosen and tighten, allowing food in and preventing it from falling out. A chamber at the entrance of the esophagus helps accommodate masses of food after it shallows. When retracted, the tongue is held behind the oral cavity in the oropharynx, preventing it from blocking the animal's breathing.

The anteater presses its tongue against its palate to smash the insects for swallowing. Unlike other mammals, giant anteaters swallow almost constantly when feeding. The giant anteater's stomach, similar to a bird's gizzard, has hardened folds to crush food, assisted by some sand and soil. The giant anteater cannot produce stomach acid of its own but digests using the formic acid of its prey.

== Distribution and status ==
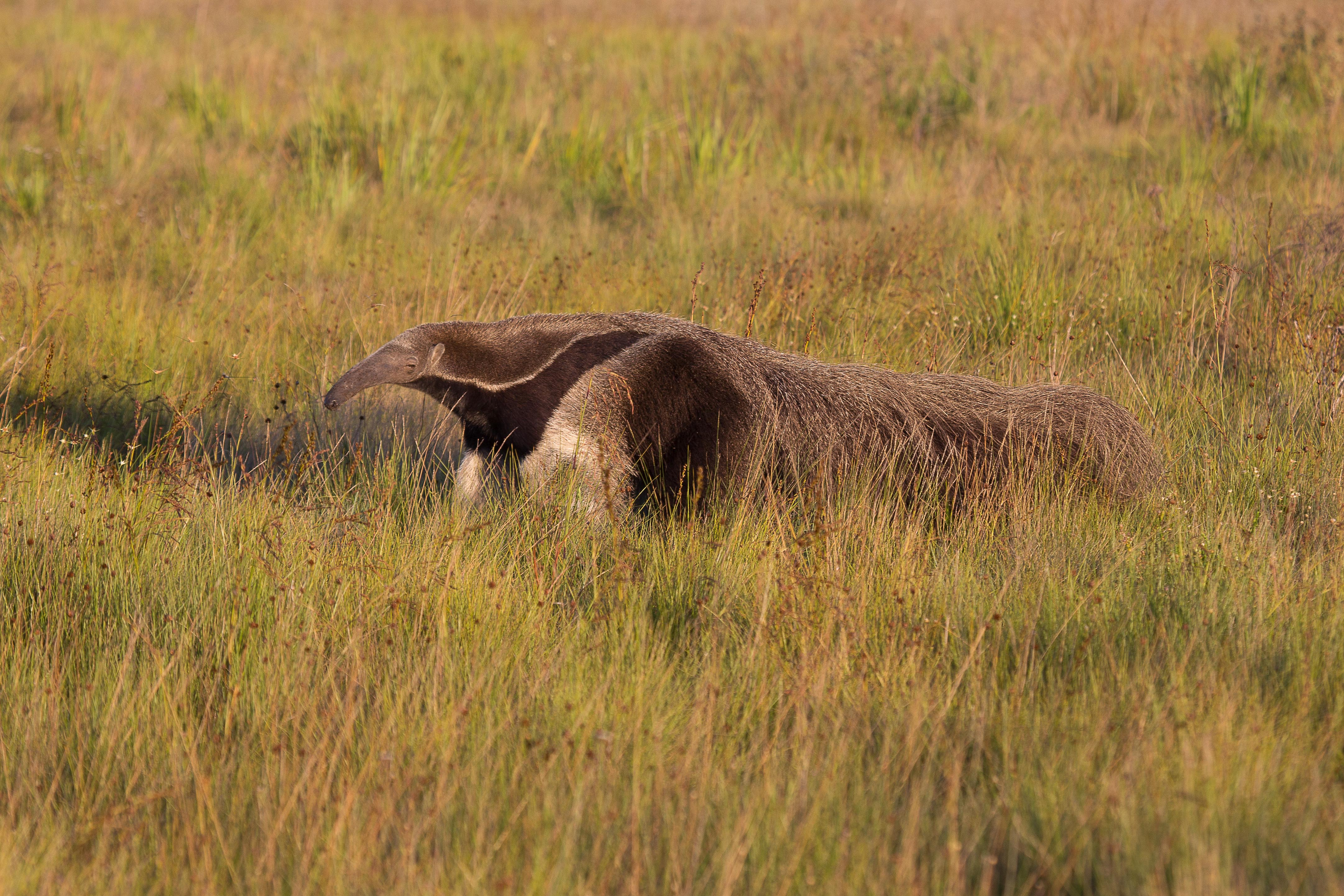
In the grasslands of Serra da Canastra National Park, Brazil

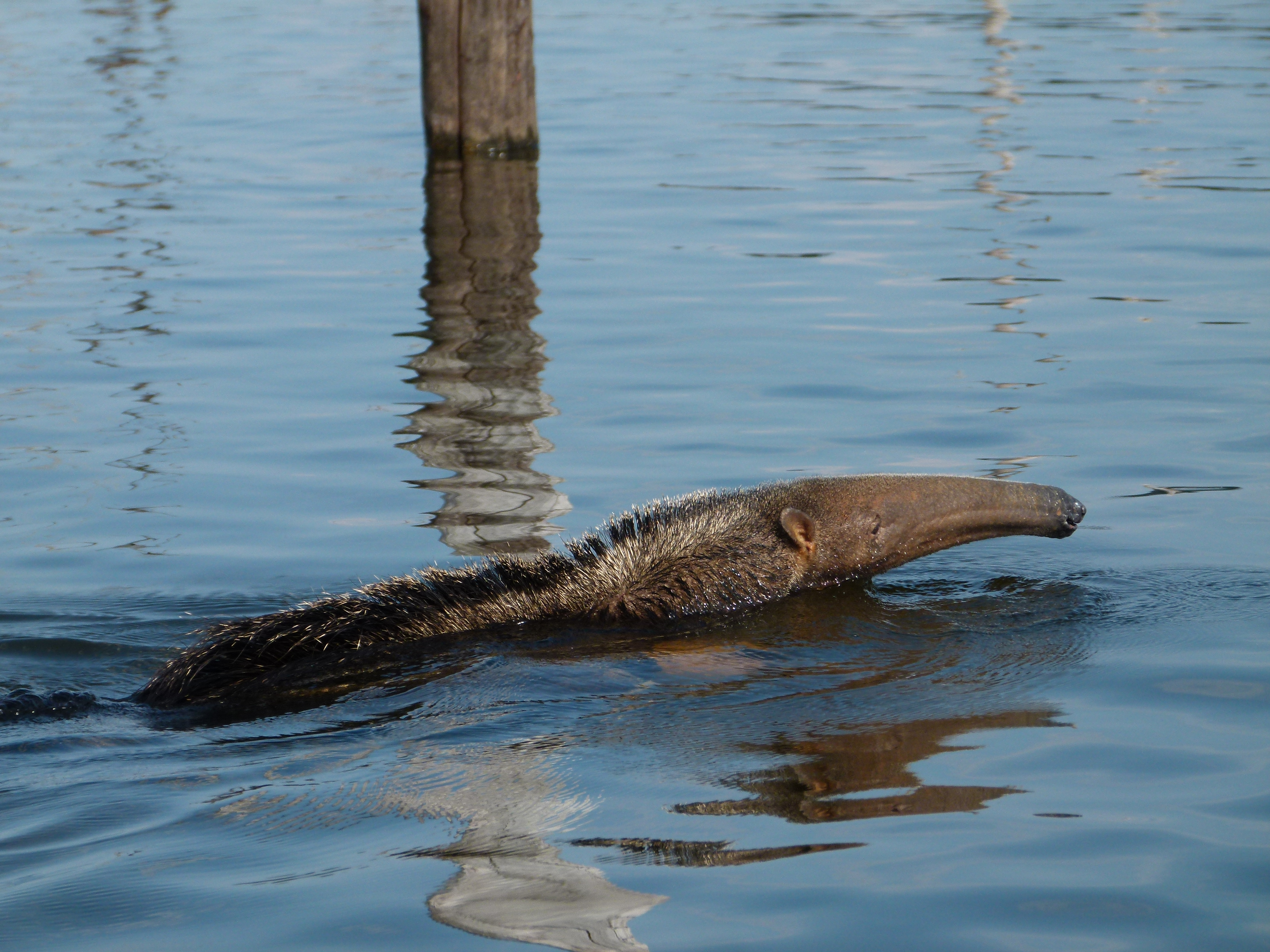
Swimming, at Uatumã Biological Reserve, Brazil

The giant anteater is native to Central and South America; its known range stretches from Honduras to Bolivia and northern Argentina, and fossil remains have been found as far north as northwestern Sonora, Mexico. It is largely absent from the Andes and has been fully extirpated in Uruguay, Belize, El Salvador, and Guatemala, as well as in parts of Costa Rica, Brazil, Argentina, and Paraguay. The species can live in both tropical rainforests and arid shrublands, provided enough prey is present to sustain it.

The species is listed as vulnerable by the International Union for Conservation of Nature, due to the number of regional extirpations, and under Appendix II by CITES, tightly restricting international trade in specimens. By 2014, the total population declined more than 30 percent "over the last three generations". In 1994, some 340 giant anteaters died due to wildfires at Emas National Park in Brazil. The animal is particularly vulnerable to fires, as its coat can easily be set ablaze, and it is too slow to escape.

Human-induced threats include collision with vehicles, attacks by dogs, and destruction of habitat. One study of anteater mortality along roads found that they are likely to be struck on linear roads near native plants. A 2018 study in Brazil found that: (1) roads were more likely to be detrimental to anteaters because of habitat fragmentation rather than vehicle accidents, (2) 18–20% of satisfactory anteater habitat did not reach minimum patch size, (3) 0.1–1% of its range had dangerously high road density, (4) 32–36% of the anteater's distribution represented critical areas for its survival, and (5) more conservation opportunities existed in the north of the country. A 2020 study in the Brazilian Cerrado found that road mortality can cut population growth by 50 percent at the local level.

The giant anteater is commonly hunted in Bolivia, both as a trophy and food. The animal's thick, leathery hide is used to make horse-riding equipment in the Chaco. In Venezuela, it is slain for its claws. Giant anteaters are also killed for their perceived danger, particularly during threat displays. The biggest ecological strengths of the species are its wide range and adaptability. The Amazon, Pantanal, and the Cerrado have various protected areas where the anteater finds refuge. In Argentina, some local governments list it as a national heritage species, affording it official protection.

== Behaviour and ecology ==
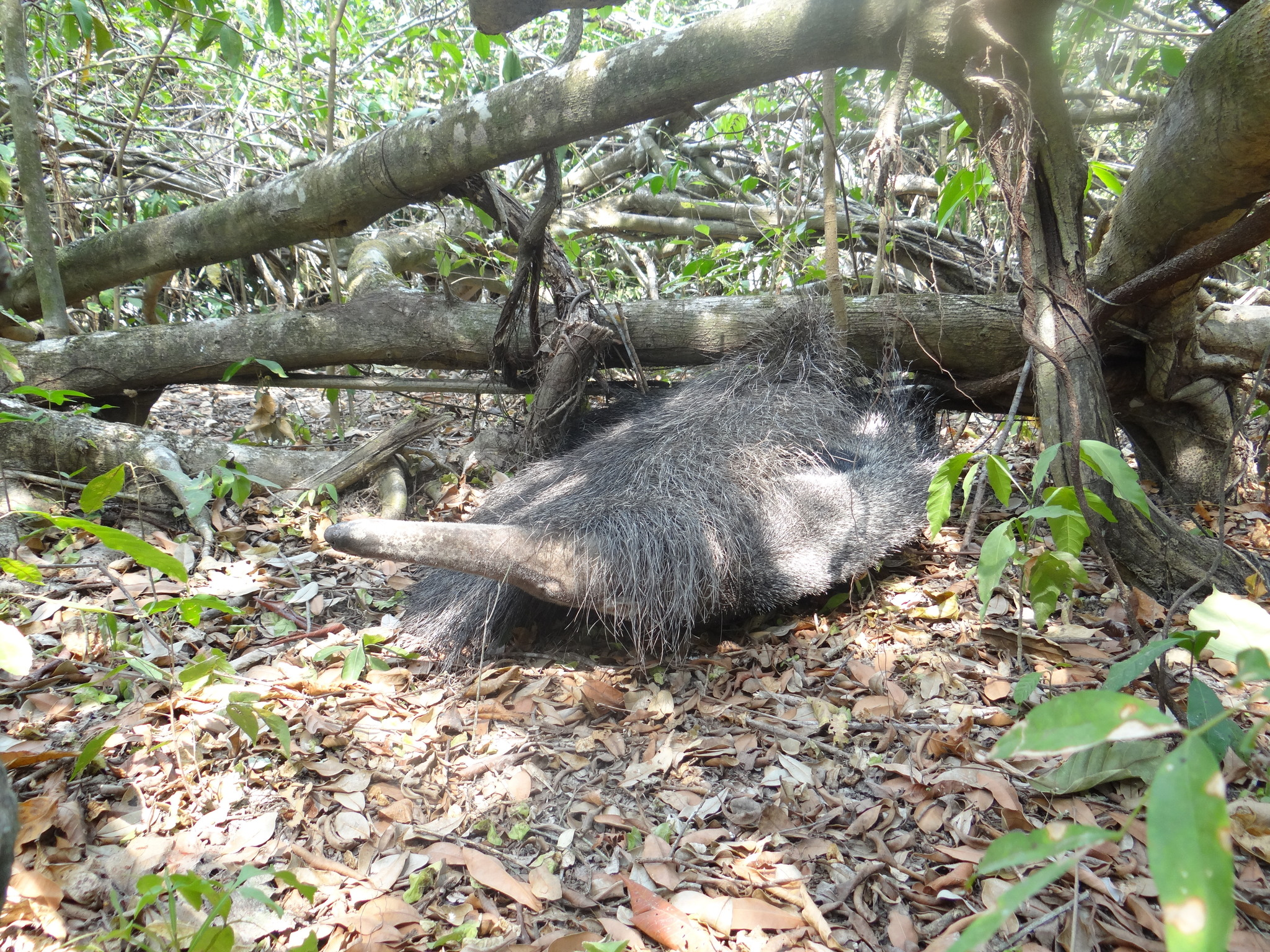
Sleeping under its tail

Despite its iconic status, the giant anteater is little studied in the wild, and research has been limited to certain areas. The species may use multiple habitats; a 2007 study of giant anteaters in the Brazilian Pantanal found that the animals move and forage in open areas and rest in forests; the latter provide shade when the temperature rises and retain heat when the temperature drops. Anteaters may travel an average of 3,700 m (12,100 ft) per day. Giant anteaters can be either diurnal or nocturnal; a 2006 study in the Pantanal found them to be mostly nocturnal when it is warm but become more active in daylight hours as the temperature drops. Diurnal giant anteaters have been observed at Serra da Canastra. Nocturnality in anteaters may be a response to human disturbances.

Giant anteaters prefer dense brush to sleep in, but when it gets cooler, they may use tall grass. When they need to rest, they carve a shallow cavity in the ground. The animal sleeps curled up with its bushy tail over its body, both to keep it warm and to camouflage it from predators. One anteater was recorded sleeping flat on its side with the tail unfolded on a 17 °C (63 °F) morning, possibly to allow its body to absorb the sun's rays for warmth. Giant anteaters sometimes enter water to bathe and even swim across wide rivers. They are also able to climb and have been recorded ascending both termite mounds and trees while foraging. One individual was observed attempting to climb a tree by rearing up and grabbing onto a branch above it.

=== Spacing ===
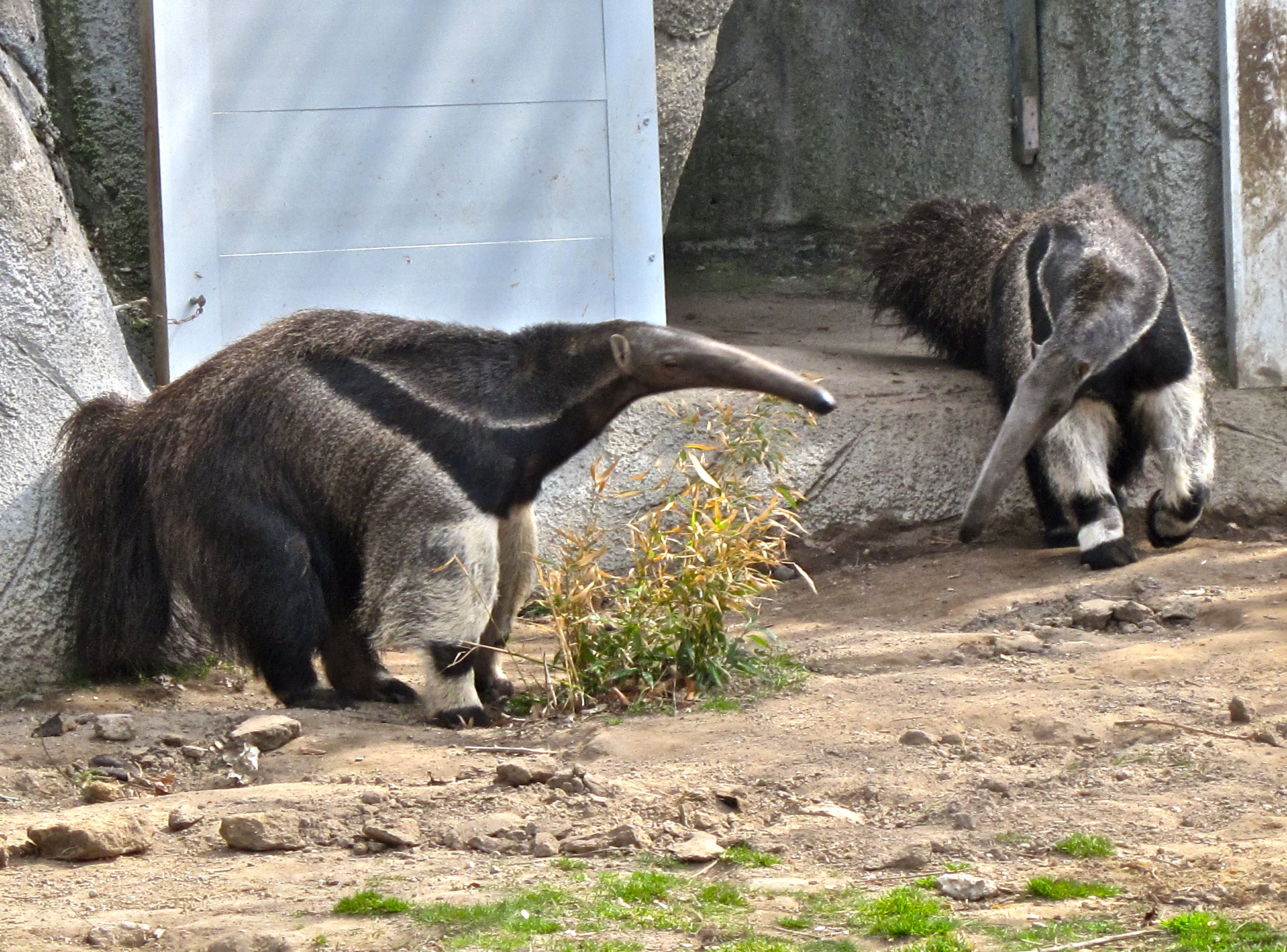
Two captive anteaters. The species is generally solitary in the wild.

Giant anteater home ranges vary in size depending on the location, ranging from as small as 2.7 km^{2} (1.0 sq mi) in Serra da Canastra National Park, Brazil, to as large as 32.5 km^{2} (12.5 sq mi) in Iberá Natural Reserve, Argentina. Individuals mostly live alone, aside from the young who stay with their mothers. Anteaters keep in contact with secretions from their anal glands and tree markings and appear to be able to recognize each other's saliva by scent.

Females are more tolerant of each other than males are and thus are more likely to be found closer together. Males are more likely to engage in agonistic behaviors, which start with the combatants approaching and circling each other while uttering a "harrr" noise. This can escalate into chasing and actual fighting. Combat includes wrestling, slashing with the claws, and bellowing. Males are possibly territorial.

=== Foraging ===
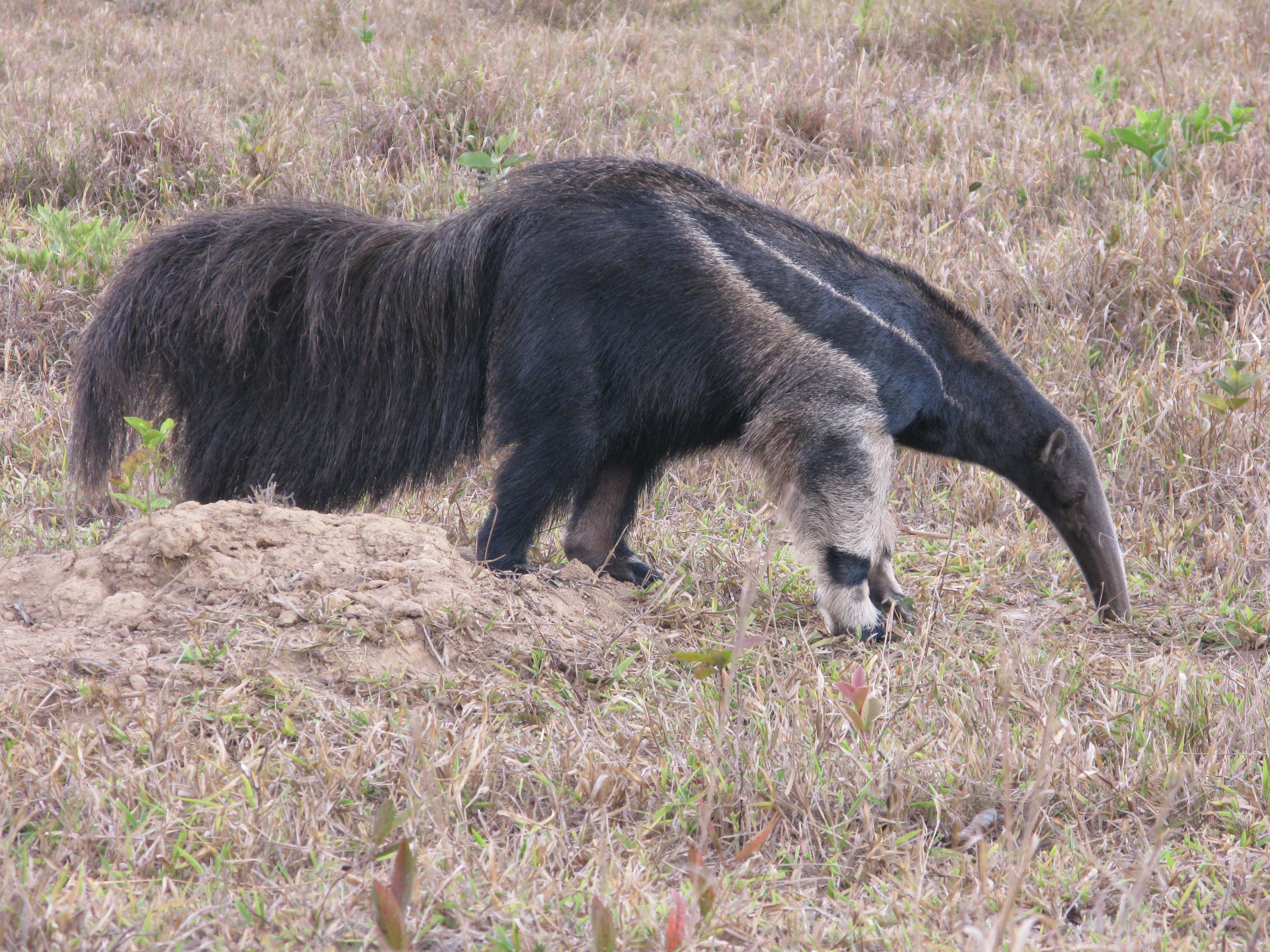
Foraging

This animal is an insectivore, and feeds mostly on ants and termites (myrmecophagy). In areas that experience regular flooding, like the Pantanal and the Venezuelan-Colombian Llanos, anteaters mainly feed on ants, which are more numerous. Conversely, termites are more numerous in the grasslands of Emas National Park and hence are a more important food source for anteaters there. At Serra da Canastra, during the wet season (October to March), anteaters eat mainly ants, while during the dry season (May to September), they switch to termites.

Anteaters track prey by their scent. After finding a nest, the animal tears it open with its claws and inserts its long, sticky tongue to collect its prey (which includes eggs, larvae, and adult insects). An anteater attacks up to 200 nests in one day, for as long as a minute each, and consumes a total of around 35,000 insects. The anteater may be driven away from a nest by the chemical or biting attacks of soldiers. Termites may rely on their fortified mounds for protection or use an underground tunnel system to escape.

Other prey include the larvae of beetles and western honey bees. Anteaters may target termite mounds with beehives. Captive anteaters are fed mixtures of milk and eggs as well as mealworms and ground beef. To drink, an anteater may dig for water when none at the surface is available, creating waterholes for other animals.

=== Reproduction and parenting ===
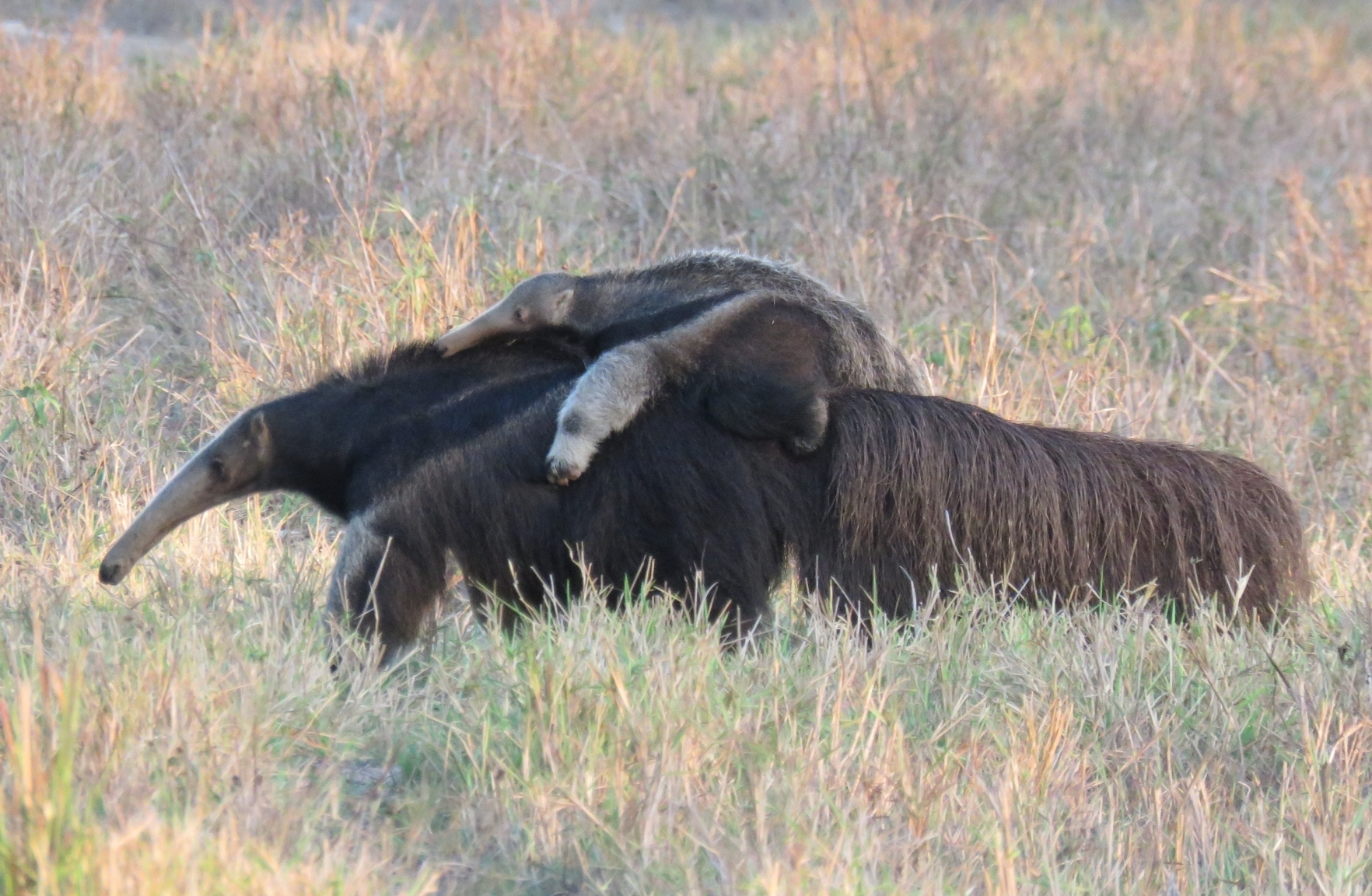
Mother carrying offspring on its back

Giant anteaters mate all year. A male trails an estrous female, who then partially raises her tail. Courting pairs are known to share the same insect nest during feeding. Mating involves the female lying sideways and the male hunching over. A couple may stay together for up to three days and mate multiple times during that period. Giant anteaters have a 170–190 day gestation period, which ends with the birth of a single pup while the female stands upright. There is some evidence that the species can experience delayed implantation.

Pups are born weighing 1–2 kg (2.2–4.4 lb) with eyes closed for the first six days. The mother carries its dependent young on its back. The pup camouflages against its mother by aligning its black and white band with hers. The mother grooms and nurses her young, who communicate with her using sharp whistles. After three months, grooming declines, and the young start to eat more solid food. Both grooming and nursing bouts end at 10 months, which is also when the young leaves its mother. They are sexually mature in 2.5–4 years.

=== Mortality ===
Giant anteaters may live around 15 years in the wild but can live twice that in captivity. The adult giant anteater has few predators; adults are hunted only by jaguars and pumas. They typically flee from danger by galloping, but if cornered, they will rear up on their hind legs and attack with their claws. The front claws of the giant anteater are formidable weapons, capable of potentially killing a jaguar. The giant anteater is a host of the Acanthocephalan intestinal parasites Gigantorhynchus echinodiscus and Moniliformis monoechinus.

== Interactions with humans ==
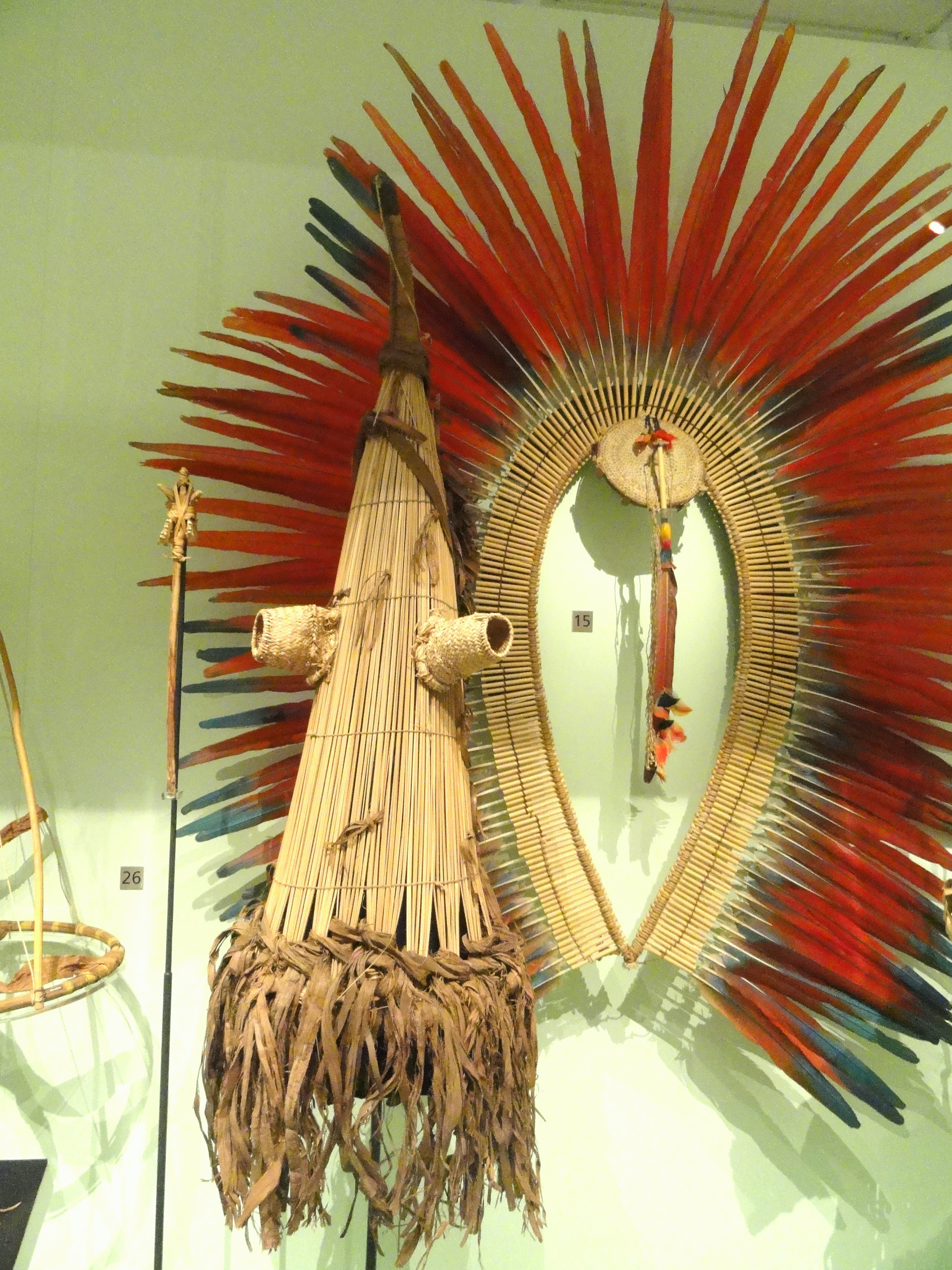
Anteater mask and scratcher used by Kayapo boys in their ceremonies

In the narratives of the indigenous peoples of the Amazon Basin, the anteater is depicted as both a trickster and a comical figure due to its appearance. In one Shipib tale, an anteater stole a jaguar's coat after challenging it to a diving contest and left the jaguar with its own pelt. In a Yarabara tale, the evil ogre Ucara is punished by the sun and turned into an anteater so he will have been unable to speak with his long snout and small mouth. The Kayapo people wear masks of various animals and spirits, including the anteater, during naming and initiation ceremonies. They hold that women who touch anteater masks or men who fall while wearing them would die or be disabled. During the Spanish colonization of the Americas, the giant anteater was among the native fauna taken to Europe for display. It was popularly thought that there were only female anteaters and they reproduced with their noses, a misconception corrected by naturalist Félix de Azara.

Although they are usually not a threat to humans, giant anteaters can inflict severe wounds with their front claws. Between 2010 and 2012, two hunters were killed by giant anteaters in Brazil; in both cases, the attacks appeared to be defensive behaviors. In April 2007, an anteater at the Florencio Varela Zoo slashed and killed a zookeeper with its front claws.
