= Palaeomyrmidon =

Palaeomyrmidon Temporal range: Late Miocene-Pliocene (Montehermosan-Chapadmalalan)

Scientific classification
- Domain: Eukaryota
- Kingdom: Animalia
- Phylum: Chordata
- Class: Mammalia
- Order: Pilosa
- Family: Cyclopedidae
- Genus: †Palaeomyrmidon; Rovereto, 1914
- Species: †P. incomtus

Binomial name
- †Palaeomyrmidon incomtus Rovereto, 1914

Extinct genus of anteaters

Palaeomyrmidon is an extinct genus of anteater. Its closest living relative is the silky anteater (Cyclopes didactylus). Although the silky anteater is arboreal, Palaeomyrmidon lived on the ground. Palaeomyrmidon is known from a fossil skull that was found in the Andalhualá Formation of Argentina.
