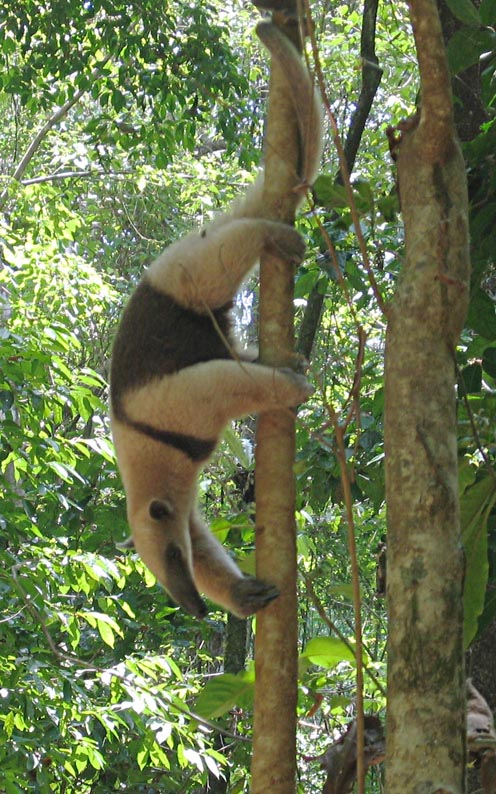

Conservation status
- Least Concern (IUCN 3.1)
- CITES Appendix III

Scientific classification
- Kingdom: Animalia
- Phylum: Chordata
- Class: Mammalia
- Infraclass: Placentalia
- Order: Pilosa
- Family: Myrmecophagidae
- Genus: Tamandua
- Species: T. mexicana

Binomial name
- Tamandua mexicana (Saussure, 1860)
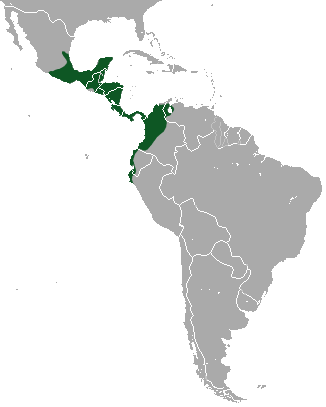
- Northern tamandua range

= Northern tamandua =

Species of mammals related to sloths and armadillos

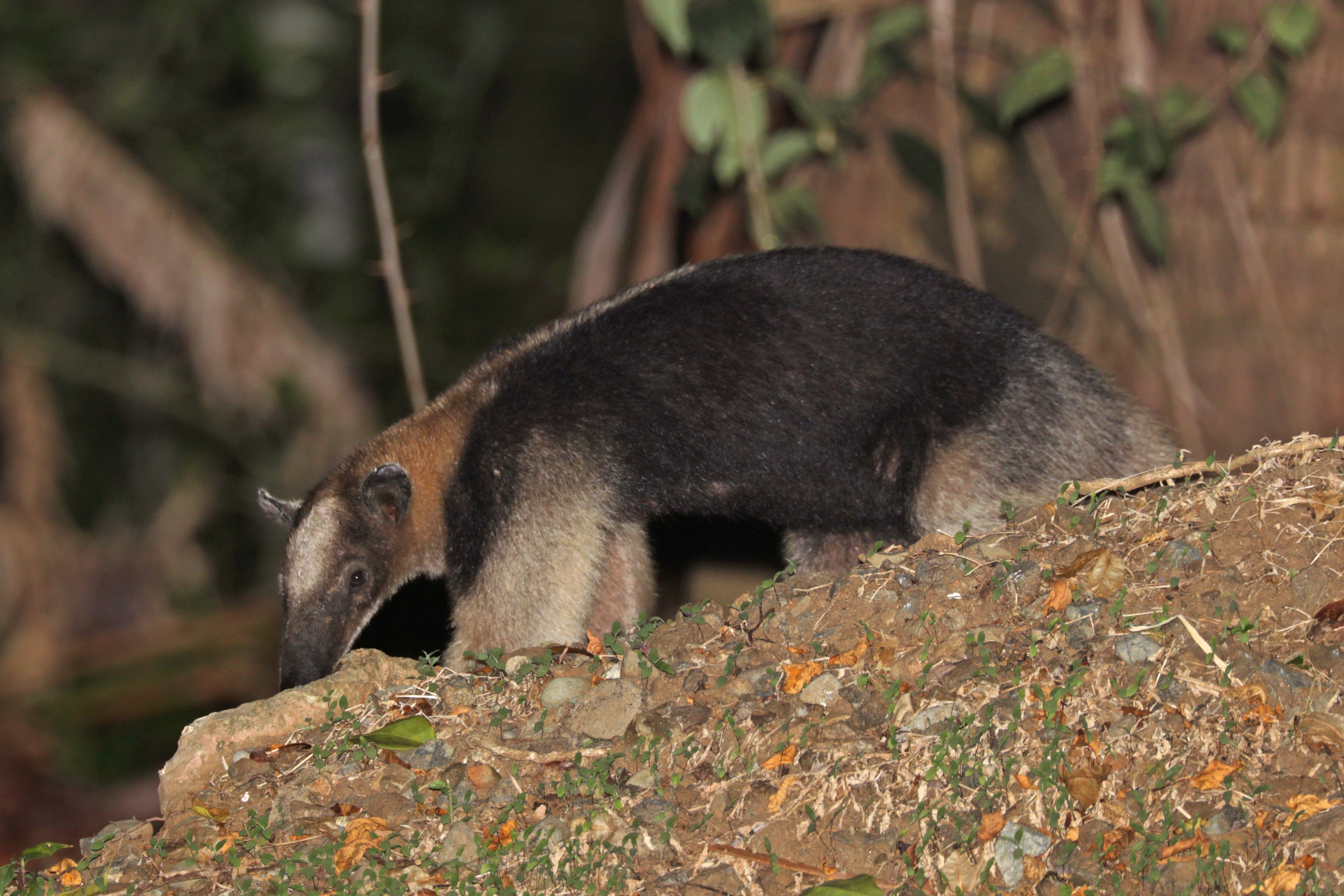
Gamboa, Panama

The northern tamandua (Tamandua mexicana) is a species of tamandua, an anteater in the family Myrmecophagidae. They live in tropical and subtropical forests from southern Mexico, through Central America, and to the edge of the northern Andes.

== Description ==
The northern tamandua is a medium-sized anteater with a prehensile tail, small eyes and ears, and a long snout. The fur is pale yellow over most of the body, with a distinctive patch of black fur over the flanks, back, and shoulders, that somewhat resembles a vest in shape. The tail has fur on its upper surface for about a third of its length, but is otherwise hairless. The hind feet have five toes, while the fore feet have only four.

Males and females are similar in size and colour, and range from 102 to 130 centimetres (40 to 51 in) in total length, including the 40 to 68 centimetres (16 to 27 in) tail. Adults weigh between 3.2 to 5.4 kilograms (7.1 to 11.9 lb).

The northern tamandua closely resembles its southern relative. In contrast to the northern tamandua, which always has a black-vested pattern, southern tamanduas are highly variable in appearance across their range. Some southern tamandua populations are entirely pale, pale with an incomplete vest, or dark-colored; however, others have the same black vest as northern tamandua, and are more reliably distinguished by size, ear length, various differences in skull shape, and number of tail vertebrae (as well as location, as the two species' ranges don't overlap).

Like other anteaters, the northern tamandua is highly adapted to its unusual diet. The tongue is long, extensible, and covered in sticky saliva able to pick up ants and termites. It has unusually well developed muscles, attached to a large hyoid bone and rooted to the top of the sternum. The entire oral cavity is modified to accommodate this tongue, and is so elongated that the back of the soft palate is level with the fifth cervical vertebra near the base of the neck, rather than at the top of the pharynx as in most other mammals. The jaw muscles and mandible are reduced, and the latter is particularly fragile. Like other anteaters, the northern tamandua has no teeth.

In addition to its diet, and unlike the giant anteater, the northern tamandua is also adapted to an arboreal lifestyle. The muscles of the toes and the presence of a tough pad on the palms makes the forefeet prehensile, enabling them to grip onto projections as it climbs. The middle toe of the forefeet also bears an unusually large claw, and the toe has enough muscle and leverage to allow it to rip open wood to get at the ants within.

== Distribution and habitat ==
The northern tamandua inhabits forests from southern Mexico, through Central America to western Colombia, Venezuela, and Ecuador, and the northwestern corner of Peru. It has been reported from various types of forest within this region, including evergreen, deciduous, mangrove swamps, cloud forests, and secondary forest. Four subspecies of T. mexicana are currently recognised:

- T. m. mexicana - Mexico, Guatemala, Belize, Honduras, El Salvador
- T. m. instabilis - Venezuela, northern Colombia
- T. m. opistholeuca - Nicaragua, Costa Rica, Panama, most of Colombia
- T. m. punensis - Ecuador, Peru

== Behaviour ==
Northern tamanduas are mainly nocturnal, but are also often active during the day, and spend only around 40% of their time in the trees. They are active for about eight hours each day, spending the rest of the time sheltering in hollow trees. They are solitary animals, occupying home ranges of between 25 and 70 ha (62 and 170 ac). Known predators include jaguars, harpy eagles and possibly large snakes.

Northern tamanduas subsist almost entirely on diets of ants and termites, although they have also been observed to eat small quantities of fruit. They prefer relatively large insects, over 4 mm (0.16 in) in length, including Camponotus, Azteca, Crematogaster, and Nasutitermes, among others. They may eat up to 9,000 insects per day, from 50 to 80 different nests, which they locate by scent and then dig into with their powerful claws. They extract the ants with their long, narrow, sticky tongues, but seem to do little permanent damage to the nests, perhaps because they do not spend long at each one before being driven away by the insects' natural defences.

The anteaters can communicate with each other by leaving scent marks with their anal scent glands. Though infants can be quite vocal, adults rarely make any sounds. If provoked, they can prop themselves up on their hind legs and tails using a tree or rock for support, and lash out with their claws.

== Reproduction ==
With no defined breeding season for northern tamanduas, females appear to be able to enter oestrus at any time of year. Males locate fertile females by scent, and court them with repeated sniffing and swatting with their claws. Eventually, they use their strong fore limbs and tails to secure the females while they mate. Gestation lasts from 130 to 190 days, and results in the birth of a single offspring. The young anteater initially shelters in a nest in a hollow tree, but later moves about by clinging to its mother's back. Young leave the mother at about a year of age, and northern tamanduas have been reported to live up to 9.5 years in captivity.
