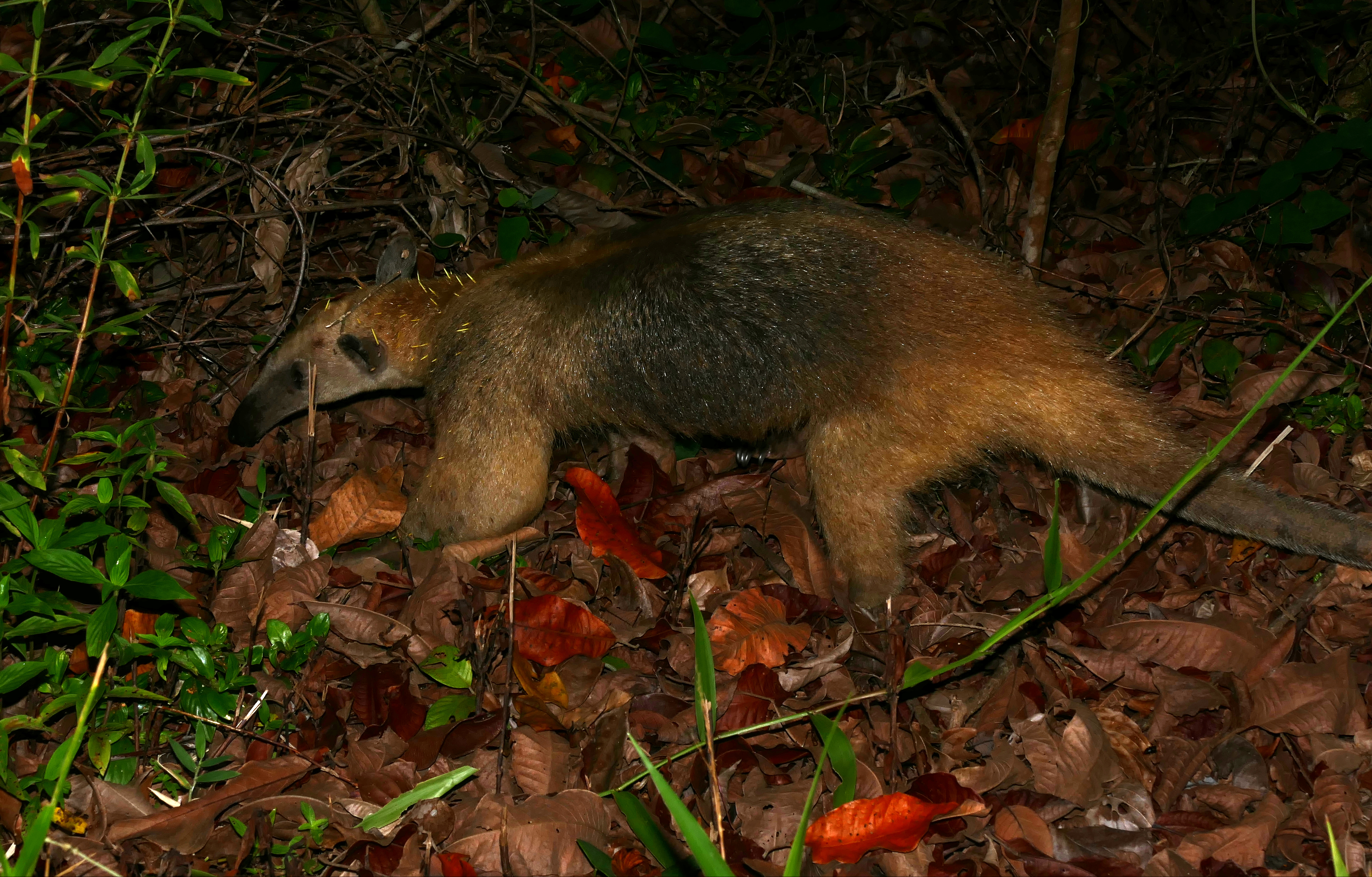

Scientific classification
- Kingdom: Animalia
- Phylum: Chordata
- Class: Mammalia
- Order: Pilosa
- Family: Myrmecophagidae
- Genus: Tamandua; J. E. Gray, 1825

Type species
- Myrmecophaga tamandua G. Cuvier, 1798 (= Tamandua tetradactyla (Linnaeus, 1758))

Species
- Tamandua tetradactyla Tamandua mexicana
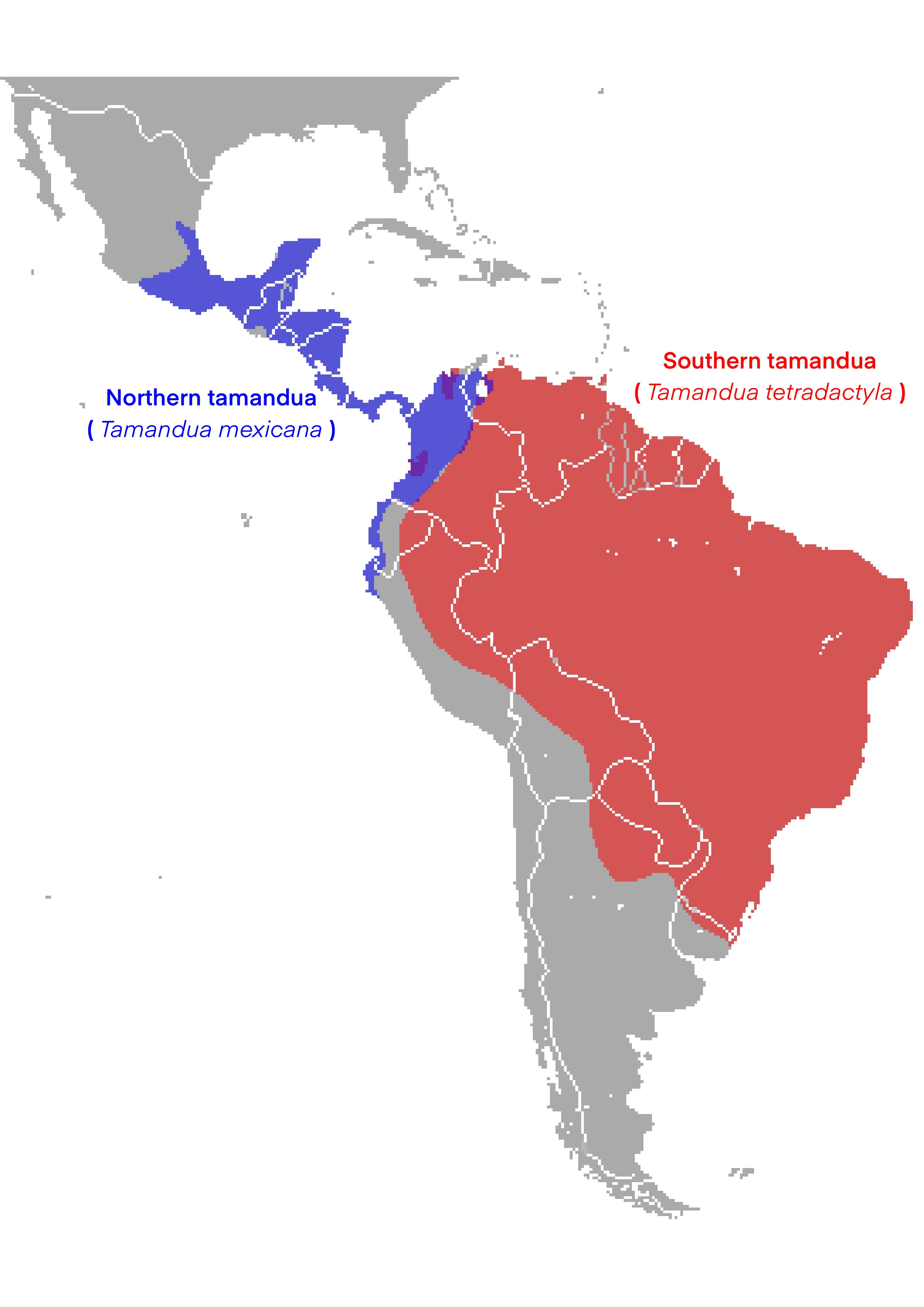

= Tamandua =

Genus of anteaters from South America

Tamandua is a genus of anteaters in the Myrmecophagidae family with two species: the southern tamandua (T. tetradactyla) and the northern tamandua (T. mexicana). They live in forests and grasslands, are semiarboreal, and possess partially prehensile tails. They mainly eat ants and termites, but they occasionally eat bees, beetles, and insect larvae. In captivity, they will eat fruits and meat.

== Taxonomy ==
The genus name is derived from the word tamandûá in Tupi first recorded by Joseph of Anchieta in his Epistola quam plurimarum rerum naturalium quae S. Vicentii (nunc S. Pauli) provinciam incolunt sistens descriptionem (1560); ta- in tamãdu'á is deduced from taixi "ant" and the other half from mondé "to catch", mondá "thief" or monduár "hunter".

== Extant species ==
Genus Tamandua – Rafinesque, 1815 – two species
Common name	Scientific name and subspecies	Range	Size and ecology	IUCN status and estimated population
Northern tamandua	Tamandua mexicana (Saussure, 1860) Four subspecies: T. m. mexicana - Mexico, Guatemala, Belize, Honduras, El Salvador; T. m. instabilis - Venezuela, northern Colombia; T. m. opistholeuca - Nicaragua, Costa Rica, Panama, most of Colombia; T. m. punensis - Ecuador, Peru	Southeastern Mexico south throughout Central America, and in South America west of the Andes from northern Venezuela to northern Peru	Size: Habitat: Diet:	LC
Southern tamandua	Tamandua tetradactyla Linnaeus, 1758 Four subspecies: T. t. tetradactyla (Linnaeus, 1758): southern and eastern Brazil, Uruguay; T. t. nigra (Geoffroy, 1803): northern Brazil, Colombia, Venezuela, Trinidad, the Guianas; T. t. quichua (Thomas, 1927): Peru, Ecuador, extreme western Brazil; T. t. straminea (Cope, 1889): southern Brazil, Paraguay, Bolivia, Argentina	Venezuela and Trinidad to northern Argentina, southern Brazil and Uruguay.	Size: Habitat: Diet:	LC

== Description ==
Tamanduas have tapered heads with a long, tubular snout, small eyes, and protruding ears. Their tapered mouths house a tongue reaching upwards of 40 cm (16 in) in length. The tail is hairless and pink in color, marked with an irregular pattern of black blotches. The forefeet possess four clawed digits, the third digit bearing the largest claw, while the hind feet have five digits.

Their fur is thick, bristly, yellowish-white to fawn in color, often with a broad black lateral band, covering nearly the whole of the side of their bodies. Northern tamanduas are marked with a black V on their backs and a "vest" over their torso; southern tamanduas vary in appearance across their range, from a vested pattern like northern tamandua, to only partially vested, to entirely light- or dark-colored.

== Behavior ==
Tamanduas are nocturnal, active at night and secreting away in hollow tree trunks and burrows abandoned by other animals during daylight hours. They can spend more than half of their time in the treetops, as much as 64%, where they forage for arboreal ants and termites. Tamanduas move rather awkwardly on the ground and are incapable of galloping like their relative, the giant anteater. Tamanduas walk on the sides of their clenched forefeet to avoid injuring their palms with their sharp claws.

Tamanduas manufacture a potent musk in their anal glands that they use for marking territory. They smear the strong-smelling secretions on rocks, trees, fallen logs, and other prominent landmarks to announce their presence to other tamanduas.

When threatened while in the trees, the tamandua will firmly grasp the branch with its hind limbs and tail and rear up to confront its attacker with slashing motions of its large, curved claws. When on the ground, it will protect its vulnerable hindquarters by backing against a tree or a rock and lashing out with its forearms.

The tamandua's small eyes afford limited vision. Instead of relying on their sense of sight, they primarily utilize their senses of smell and hearing to locate their insect prey. They use their sharp claws and powerful forearms to tear open the nest of a colony of termites and employ their elongated tongues, coated with sticky saliva, to extract the insects.

Female tamanduas reach sexual maturity at one year old and during their gestation period, which is around 160 days, typically have a single offspring. After being born, a tamandua pup rides on its mother's back and is left on a branch while its mother forages.

== Conservation ==
The IUCN Red List considers both as species of concern. They are currently fairly common, yet face various threats. In Ecuador, tamanduas are killed as a precaution due to the erroneous belief that they attack domestic dogs. Elsewhere, they are hunted for meat or captured for the pet trade. They are also taken for the thick tendons in their tails, which are made into cordage.

== Relationship with humans ==
The tamandua is frequently kept as an exotic pet. Tamanduas are also used occasionally by Amazonian Native Tribes as a form of biological pest control, utilizing them to rid their dwellings of termites and ants.
