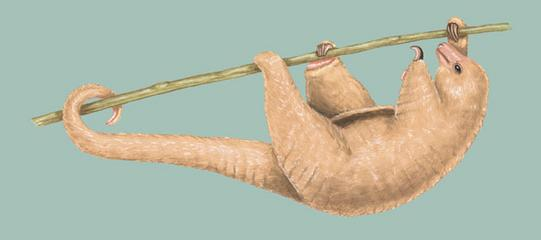

Scientific classification
- Kingdom: Animalia
- Phylum: Chordata
- Class: Mammalia
- Order: Pilosa
- Suborder: Vermilingua
- Family: Cyclopedidae; Pocock, 1924

Genera
- Cyclopes (Silky anteater); Palaeomyrmidon†
- Extant Cyclopedidae distribution

= Cyclopedidae =

Cyclopedidae Temporal range: Pliocene to present

Family of anteaters

The Cyclopedidae is a family of anteaters that includes the silky anteater and its extinct relative, Palaeomyrmidon.
