= List of National Natural Landmarks in New Mexico =

There are 12 National Natural Landmarks in New Mexico.

New Mexico National Natural Landmarks (clickable map)

Name	Image	Date	Location	County	Ownership	Description
Border Hills Structural Zone		1980	33.367226°N 104.948359°W	Lincoln	federal (Bureau of Land Management)	A rare example of wrench faulting outside the Pacific Coast region.
Bitter Lake Group		1980	33.456047°N 104.401621°W	Chaves	federal (Bitter Lake National Wildlife Refuge)	Saline artesian lakes that provide habitat for the only inland occurrence of a marine alga and two rare fish species.
Bueyeros Shortgrass Plains		1980		Harding	private	An example of the blue grama-buffalograss prairie of the Great Plains.
Fort Stanton Cave		1980	33.499099°N 105.523798°W	Lincoln	federal (Fort Stanton – Snowy River Cave National Conservation Area)	Cave containing distinctive examples of selenite needles, starbursts, and velvet flowstone.
Grants Lava Flow		1969	34.888718°N 107.993472°W	Valencia	federal (El Malpais National Conservation Area) & native (Acoma Pueblo)	One of the best examples of recent extrusive volcanism.
Ghost Ranch		1975	36.329789°N 106.474°W	Rio Arriba	private	Fossil site where well-preserved Coelophysis skeletons were found.
Kilbourne Hole	Kilbourne Hole	1975	31.971944°N 106.964722°W	Doña Ana	federal (Bureau of Land Management)	An example of an uncommon volcanic feature known as a maar.
Mathers Research Natural Area		1980		Chaves	federal (Bureau of Land Management)	The best example of a shinnery oak-sand prairie community in the southern Great Plains.
Mescalero Sands South Dune		1982	33.416122°N 103.869842°W	Chaves	federal (Bureau of Land Management)	The best example of an active sand dune system in the southern Great Plains.
Ship Rock	Ship Rock	1975	36.6875°N 108.836389°W	San Juan	native (Navajo Nation)	An outstanding example of an exposed volcanic neck accompanied by radiating dikes.
Torgac Cave		1974		Lincoln	federal (Bureau of Land Management)	Cave with distinctive branching stalactites and helictites, the type site of Torgac-type helictites.
Valles Caldera	Valle Grande dome	1975	35.9°N 106.533333°W	Rio Arriba, Sandoval	federal (Valles Caldera National Preserve)	One of the largest calderas in the world.

== See also ==
- List of National Historic Landmarks in New Mexico
