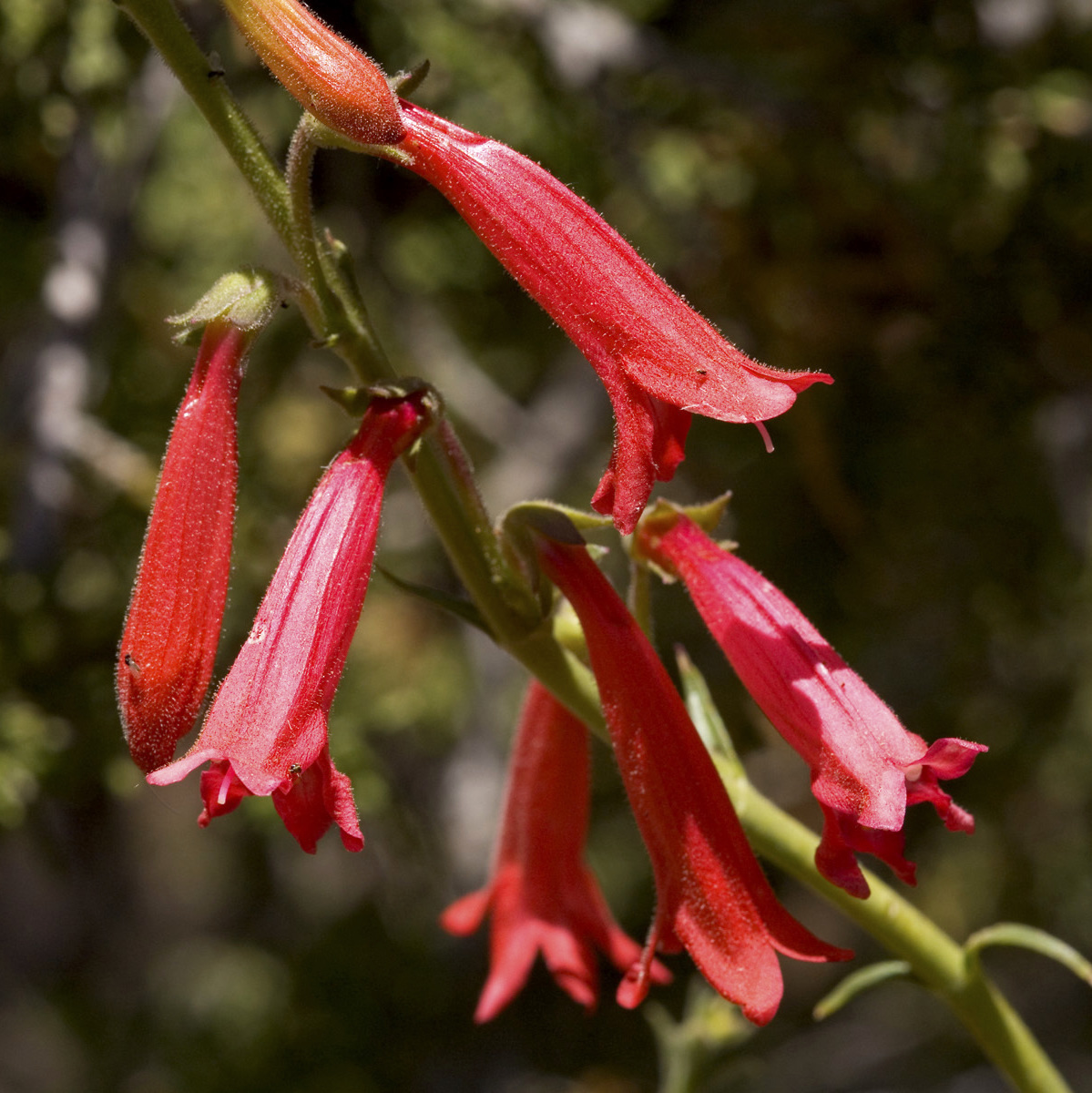
- Organ Mountains–Desert Peaks National Monument

Scientific classification
- Kingdom: Plantae
- Clade: Tracheophytes
- Clade: Angiosperms
- Clade: Eudicots
- Clade: Asterids
- Order: Lamiales
- Family: Plantaginaceae
- Genus: Penstemon
- Species: P. lanceolatus

Binomial name
- Penstemon lanceolatus Benth.

Synonyms
- Penstemon pauciflorus; Penstemon ramosus

= Penstemon lanceolatus =

Plant species in the veronica family

Penstemon lanceolatus, the lanceleaf penstemon, is a species in the veronica family from Mexico and the southwestern United States. It has red tubular flowers that are pollinated by hummingbirds.

== Description ==
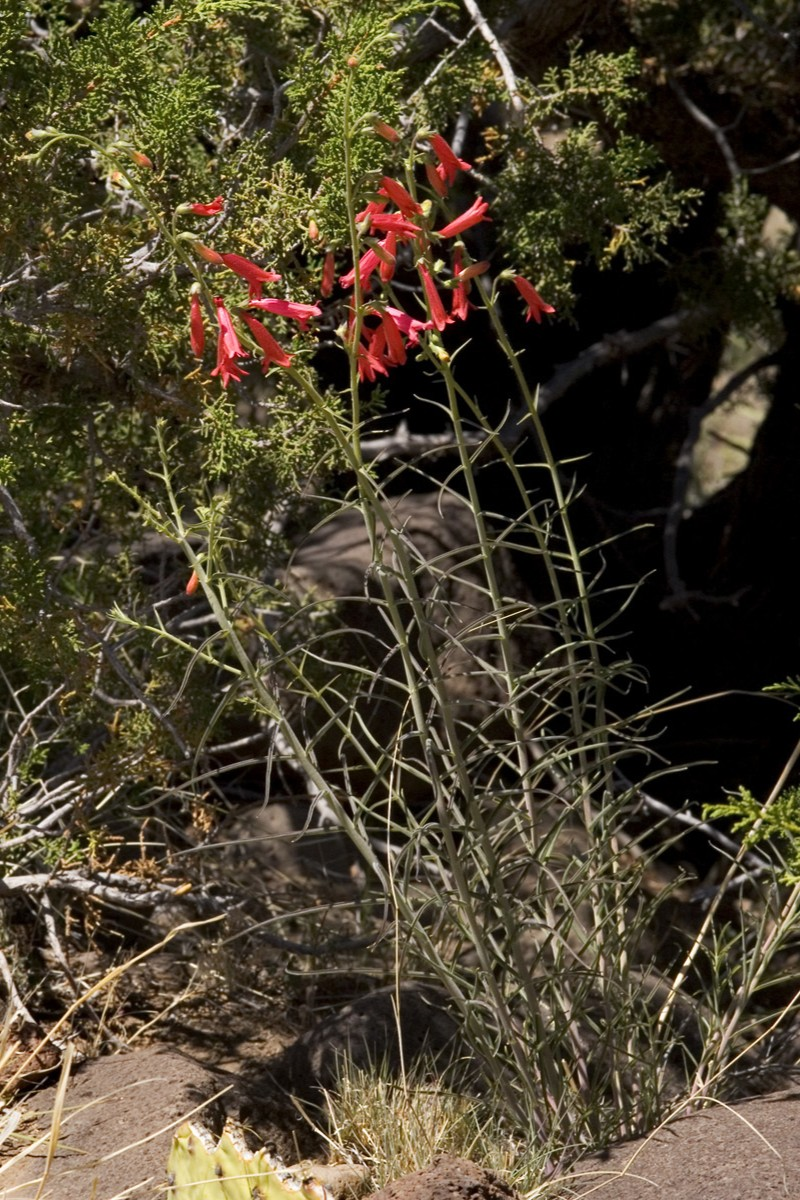
Plant with flowers

Lanceleaf penstemons are a herbaceous species that grows flowering stems that are usually 24 to 75 centimeters (9.5–29.5 in) tall, but can occasionally be as much as 98 cm (38.5 in). Stems are densely to lightly covered in hairs that can be stiff and backwards pointing. Hairs near the top of the flowering stems are normally glandular.

The leaves are covered in backwards pointing hairs and are attached both to the base of the plant and to the stems. The basal leaves and the lowest ones on the stems are 8–80 millimeters long and 3–12 mm wide, very narrowly lanceolate or spatulate. The stems have seven to fifteen leaf pairs attached to opposite sides of the stem. The upper leaves are 9–110 mm long and 1–22 mm wide and are narrowly lanceolate to grass-like.

The flowers are scarlet to red funnel shaped tubes measuring 2.2–3.5 centimeters long. Both the interior and exterior of the flowers are covered in glandular hairs and the lower surface can have faint floral guide lines. The stamens extend out of the flower's mouth, but are hidden by the upper lobes that extend outward into a beak-like structure. The staminode is 15–17 mm long and does not extend out of the flower. The flowers are in an inflorescence with three to six groups each with two point of attachment with one to three flowers from each point. Like many other penstemons with red flowers, the lanceleaf penstemon is pollinated by hummingbirds.

The fruit is a capsule 9–14 mm long and 6–7 mm wide.

== Taxonomy ==
In 1839 the botanist George Bentham scientifically described a species that he named Penstemon lanceolatus. The type specimen was collected by Karl Theodor Hartweg in the state of Aguascalientes in Mexico. It is classified in genus Penstemon which is part of the Plantaginaceae family. The species has no subspecies, but it has two heterotypic synonyms. In 1866 Edward Lee Greene described a species he named Penstemon pauciflorus, however this name had already been used in 1861 by Samuel Botsford Buckley making this an illegitimate name. The second is Penstemon ramosus described by Frank Samuel Crosswhite in 1966 as a name to replace P. pauciflorus Greene. Greene and Crosswhite regarded the penstemons growing in Arizona and New Mexico due to some differences with similar penstemons in Mexico, but other researchers consider the differences insignificant. P. ramosus is regarded as a synonym of P. lanceolatus by Plants of the World Online, World Plants, and the Flora of North America, but it is regarded as the correct name for a separate species by NatureServe and the Natural Resources Conservation Service.

=== Names ===
The species name, lanceolatus, means 'lance-shaped' in Botanical Latin, a reference to the lanceolate leaves. Penstemon lanceolatus is known by the common names lanceleaf penstemon or lanceleaf beardtongue.

== Range and habitat ==
The majority of the lanceleaf penstemon's range is in Mexico with the species only found in the southernmost parts of Arizona, New Mexico, and Texas. In Mexico it is native to one state in the northwest, Sonora. In the north it grows in Chihuahua, Durango, Coahuila, Zacatecas, Aguascalientes, Nuevo León, Tamaulipas, and San Luis Potosí. The species is also native to the Gulf Coast state of Veracruz. In the west it is found in just Nayarit and Jalisco.

In Arizona it is native to just three southeastern counties, Cochise, Graham, and Greenlee. In New Mexico it is found in five southern counties, Doña Ana, Grant, Hidalgo, Luna, and Sierra, but only in Brewster County in Texas's Trans-Pecos.

This penstemon grows in rocky soils in piñon–juniper woodlands, pine forests, scrublands, and desert grasslands at elevations of 1,200–1,800 meters (3,900–5,900 ft).

=== Conservation ===
The conservation organization NatureServe has only evaluated Penstemon ramosus in 2004 and has not evaluated Penstemon lanceolatus. In New Mexico they consider it to be vulnerable (S3) and in Texas and Arizona they rate it as critically imperiled (S1).

== See also ==
- List of Penstemon species
