= Dropstone =

Rock fragments found within host rock

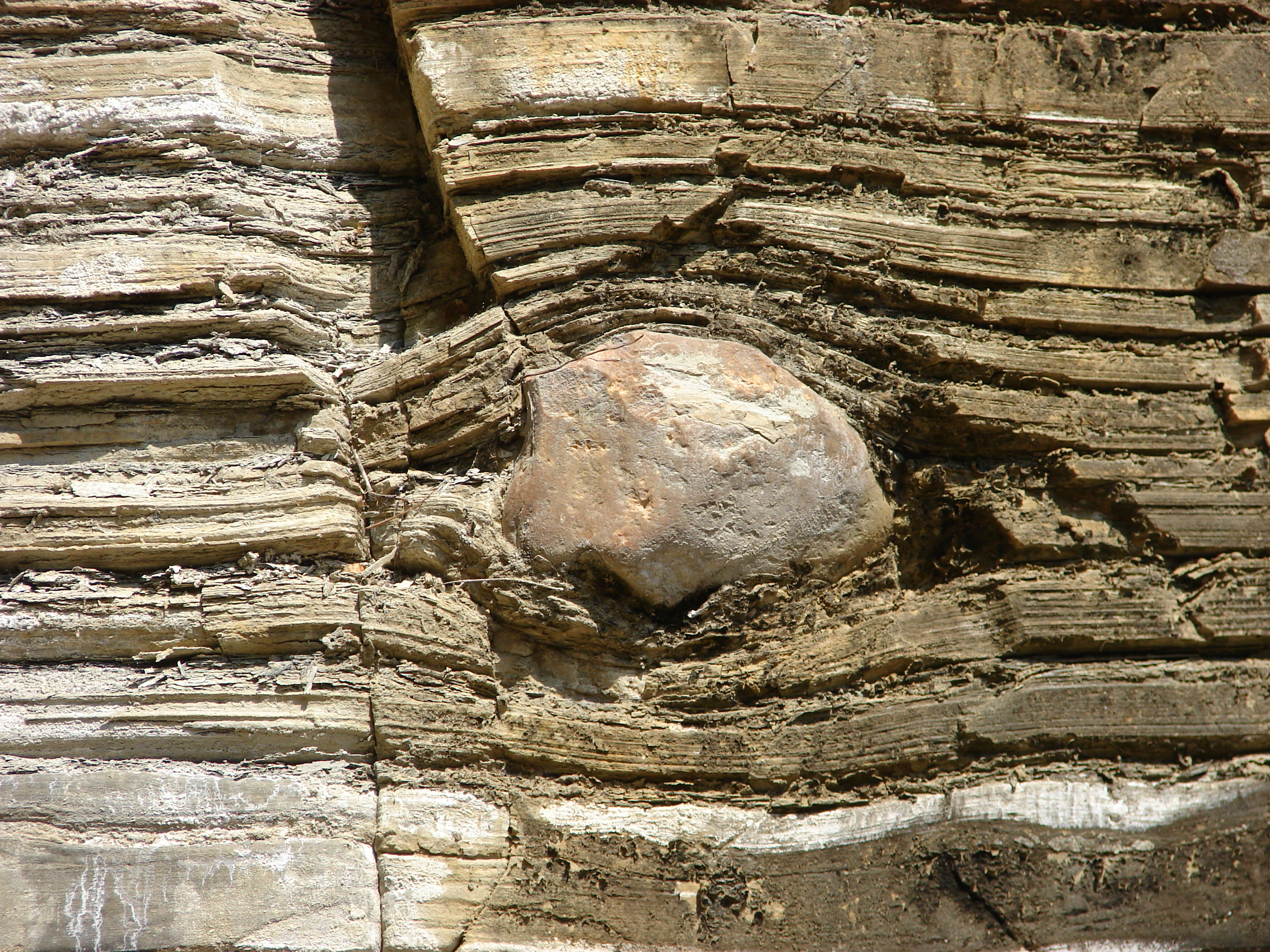
A dropstone of quartzite in layered rhythmite at Itu, Brazil

Dropstones are isolated fragments of rock found within finer-grained water-deposited sedimentary rocks or pyroclastic beds. They range in size from small pebbles to boulders. The critical distinguishing feature is that there is evidence that they were not transported by normal water currents, but rather dropped in vertically through the air or water column, such as during a volcanic eruption.

== Background ==
When deposited into fine layered mud, such evidence includes an impact depression beneath the dropstone, and indication that the mud has been squeezed up around the edges of the falling rock. Subsequent deposits of mud drape over the dropstone and its crater. Glacial dropstones, involving rocks falling out of icebergs, are one of the most common types of dropstone preserved in the geological record, particularly when deposited in low-energy deep sea or lake environments. Dropstones differ from erratics found in glacial till in that they are deposited in a lake or marine environments. Dropstones may also be deposited by a variety of non-glacial means.

== Origin of dropstones ==
There are five natural mechanisms that produce dropstones:

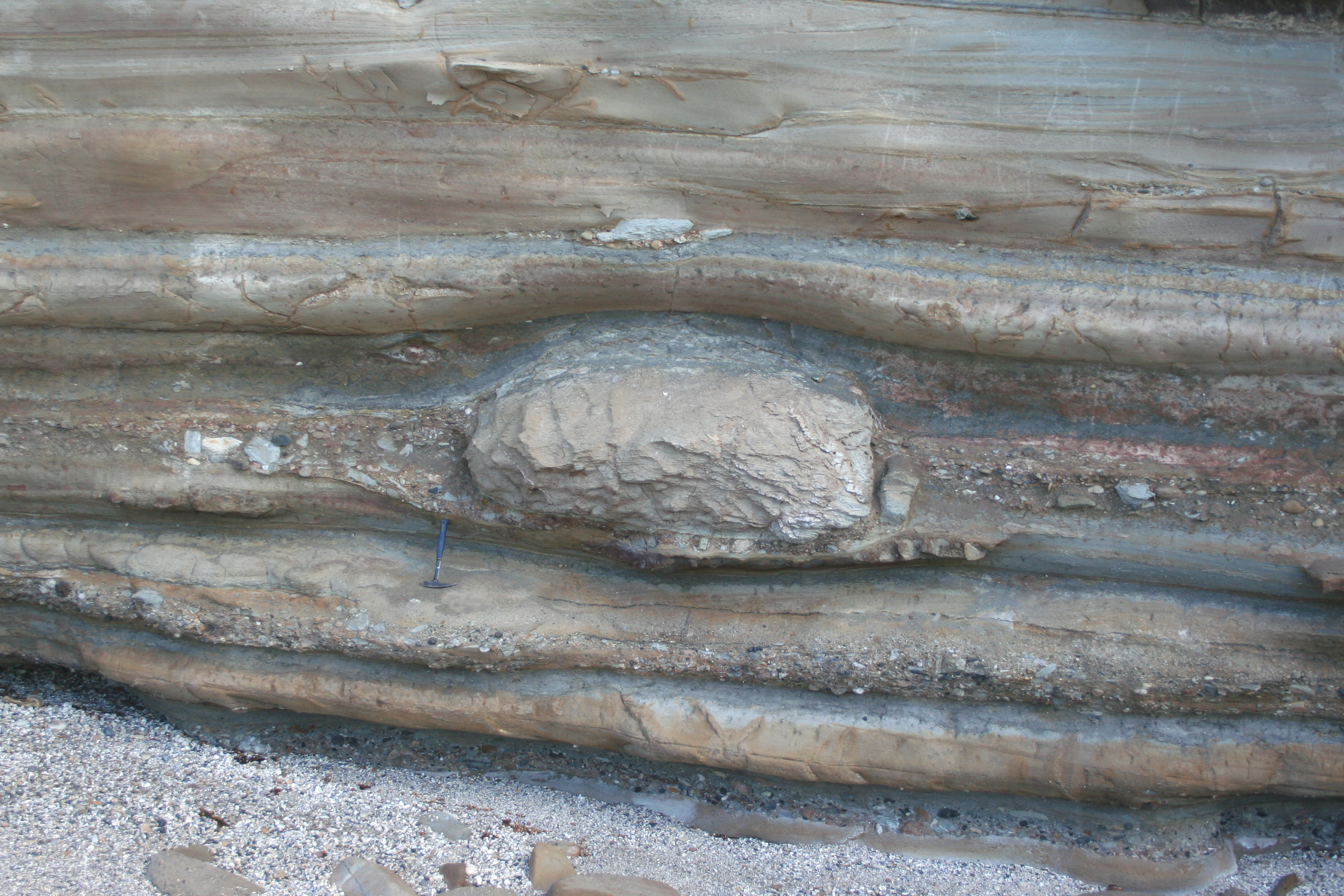
Glacial dropstone from Permian rocks in eastern Australia

=== Glaciers ===
As glaciers move across a surface, they pluck rocks from it, and incorporate them into their mass. At the coast, fragments of glacier detach and float away as icebergs, which are often transported (ice rafted) many miles into the ocean, where they melt and deposit their load. When entrained rocks sink to the ocean floor, they can be incorporated into the oceanic sediments, which are typically fine grained. Glacially deposited rock differing from the size and type of rock native to the area in which it rests is called a glacial erratic.

=== Volcanoes ===
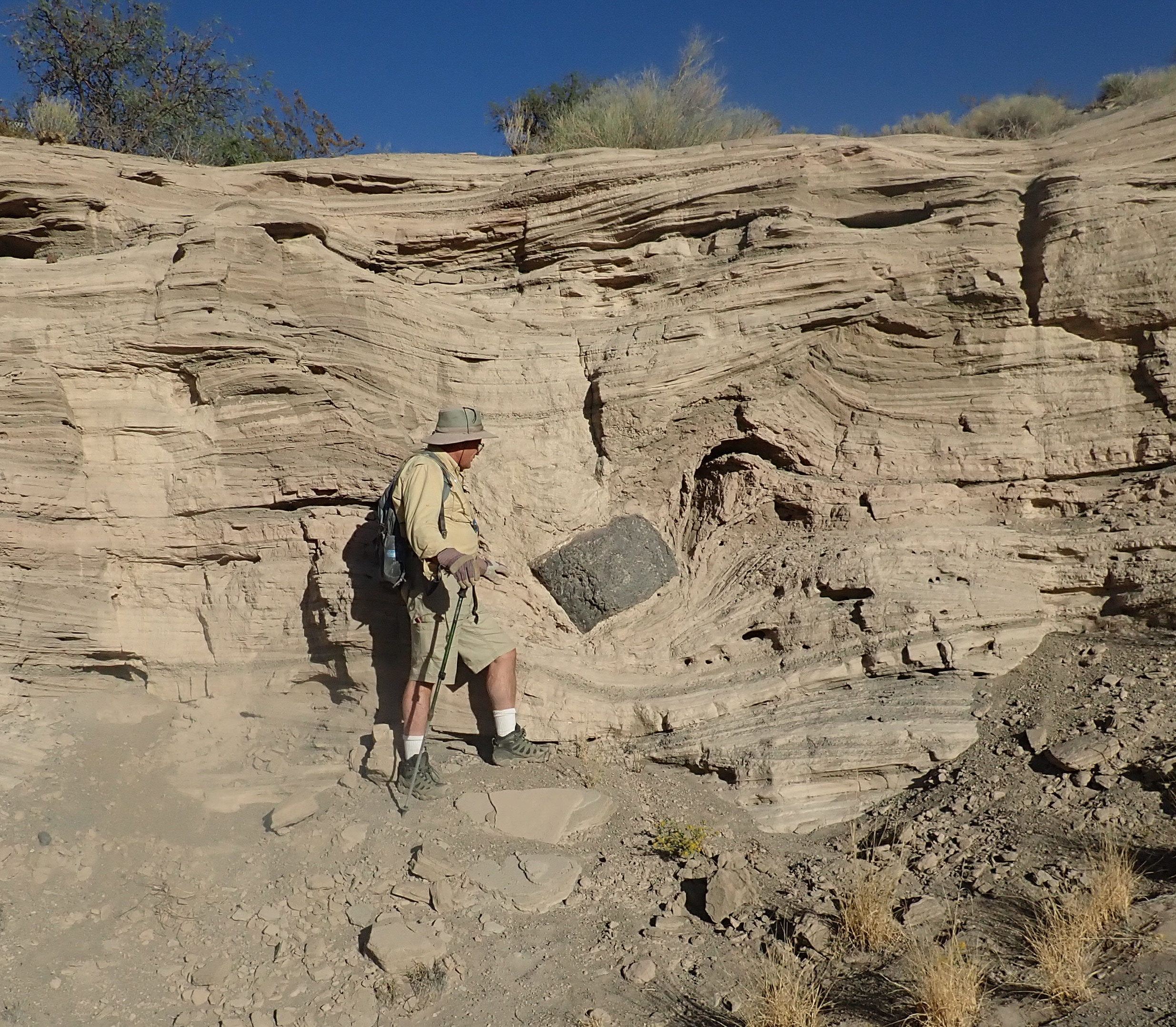
Dropstone within pyroclastic bed in the wall of Kilbourne Hole, Organ Mountains-Desert Peaks National Monument, New Mexico, United States

Whilst dropstones were once thought to be diagnostic of glaciers, it has since been realised that they can also be formed via volcanic eruptions. Volcanic bombs are large fragments of rock, projected many miles by the force of an eruption. If these land in fine sediments or pumice-forming ash, they can form dropstones. Dropstones originating in this fashion are relatively rare in the geological record as most will land on high ground, which has a poor preservation potential as it is in an erosive environment. However, a large blast may spread bombs far enough for them to end up in a marine setting of fine enough sediment for them to be recognized, or may land in or be buried by pyroclastic flows and surges.

=== Turbidity currents ===
Dropstones can also be deposited through the action of strong ocean-floor turbidity currents. Boulders the size of a human have been found in relatively recent finely laminated sediments near Jamaica, which has been a warm tropical island entirely devoid of glaciers since it came into existence. Whilst turbidity currents are cited as the origin of the boulders, they are not found in association with deposits formed by them.

=== Biological rafts ===
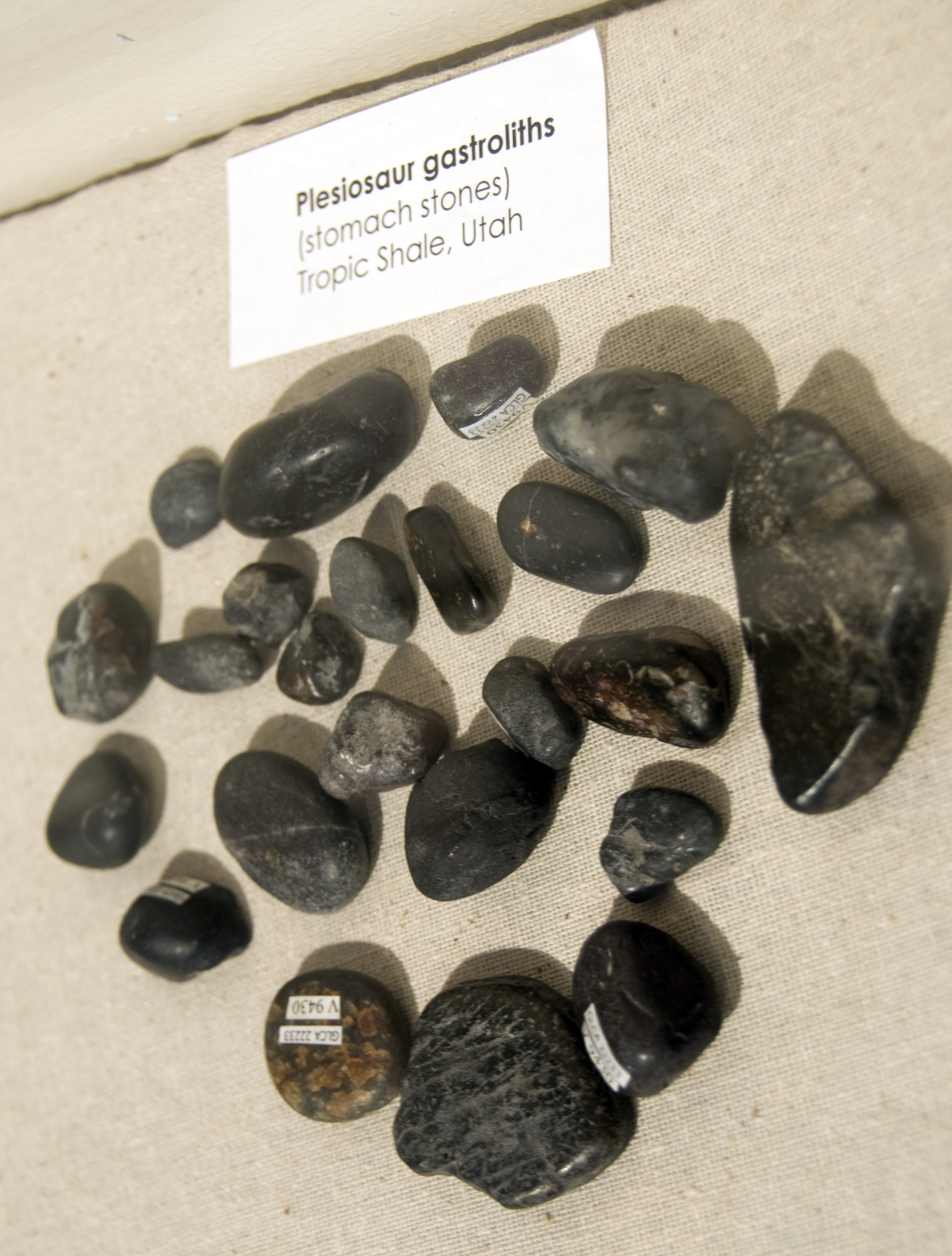
Examples of gastrolith dropstones from the Tropic Shale (Cretaceous) of Utah

Stones can also be transported large distances by becoming bound in a raft of floating plant material or in the roots of floating trees. When such a raft disintegrates due to waterlogging and sinking of its constituents, the transported rocks would also sink. Dropstones formed in this manner are typically associated with organic matter, especially logs – the fossilised remains of the raft that caused its transport.

Vertebrates, including ancient dinosaurs, may also act as dropstone agents by ingesting gastroliths and depositing them on land or within standing bodies of water by regurgitation or when the organism dies. These rock clasts, usually siliceous, are anomalous compared to the eventual surrounding rocks, and are much more easily preserved than the bones and other organic material of the biological organism that deposited them. There are over 10 known examples of dinosaur remains actually with associated "dropstones", sometimes with as many as 200 clasts. And many other rounded clasts in some of the dinosaur era sediments are debated among scholars as to their origin - gastroliths (i.e., biological dropstones) or ancient, strange river sediments.

=== Meteorites ===
Meteorites landing in marine depositional environments are a fifth category of dropstone. A number of meteorites have been found in Sweden's Thorsberg quarry, where they sank to the bottom of a shallow sea and were entombed in limestone 470 million years ago.

== See also ==
- Glacial erratic
- Ice rafting
