= Aden Lava Flow Wilderness =

Protected area in New Mexico, US

- Aden Lava Flow Wilderness Study Area
- IUCN category Ib (wilderness area)
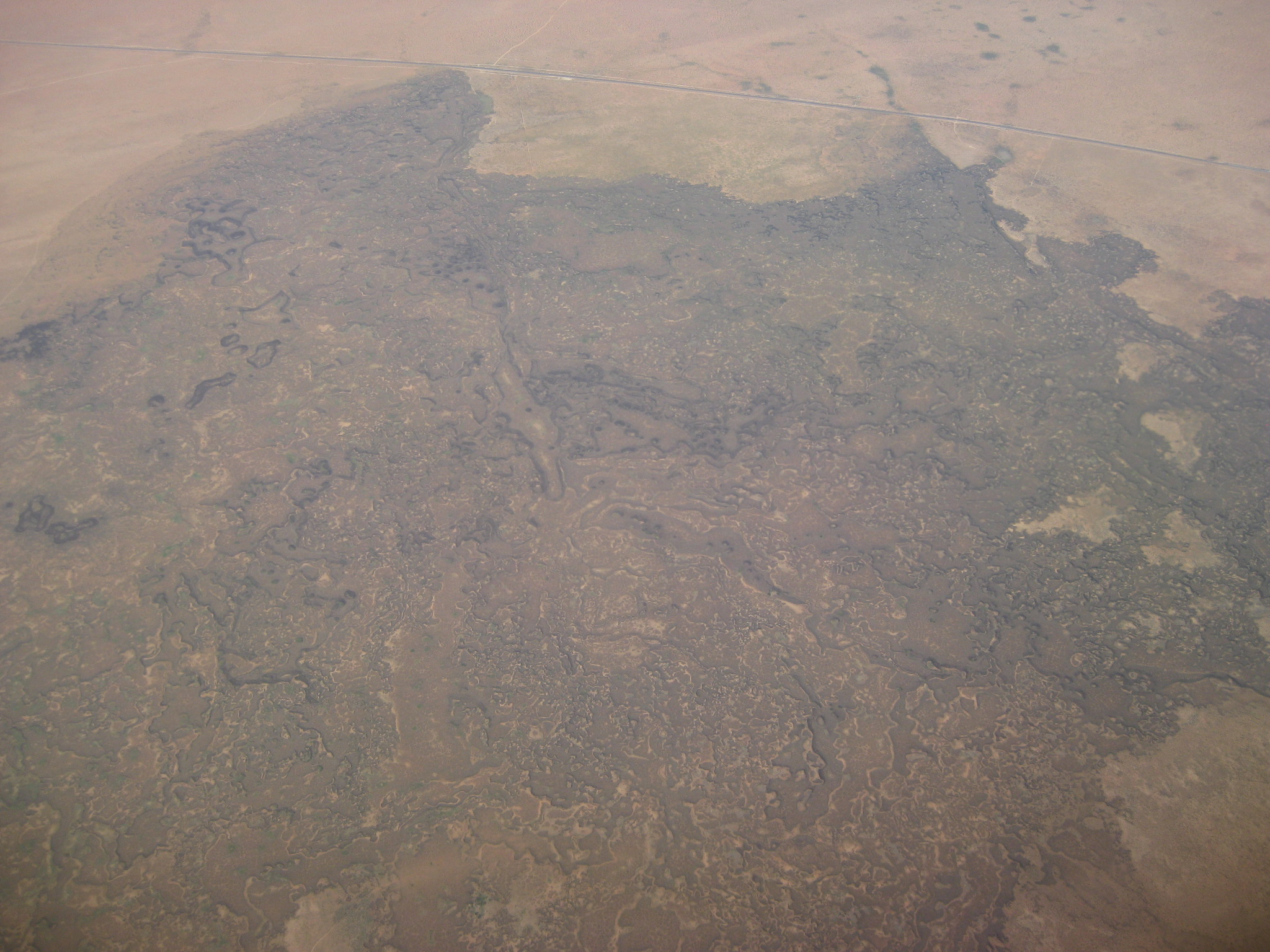
- Oblique air photo of northern part of Aden-Afton Lava Flow, taken August 2011, facing north

- Location within New Mexico Location within the United States
- Location: Doña Ana County, New Mexico
- Nearest city: Las Cruces, New Mexico
- Coordinates: 32°04′N 107°01′W
- Area: 25,287 acres (102.33 km^{2})
- Designated: 2019
- Governing body: Bureau of Land Management

Aden Lava Flow Wilderness is one of many Wildernesses operated by the Bureau of Land Management (BLM) in New Mexico. It is 25,287 acres (10,233 ha) in size. The John D. Dingell Jr. Conservation, Management, and Recreation Act, signed March 12, 2019, designates the Wilderness as a component of the National Wilderness Preservation System, protecting approximately 27,673 acres.

Prior to its 2019 designation, it was known as the Aden Lava Flow Wilderness Study Area.

It lies within the Potrillo volcanic field southwest of Las Cruces, and is south of County Road B002. Aden Crater lies at the western side of the lava flow.

Location of the Aden area
