= Kilbourne Hole =

Maar in New Mexico, United States

Coordinates: 31°58′19″N 106°57′53″W

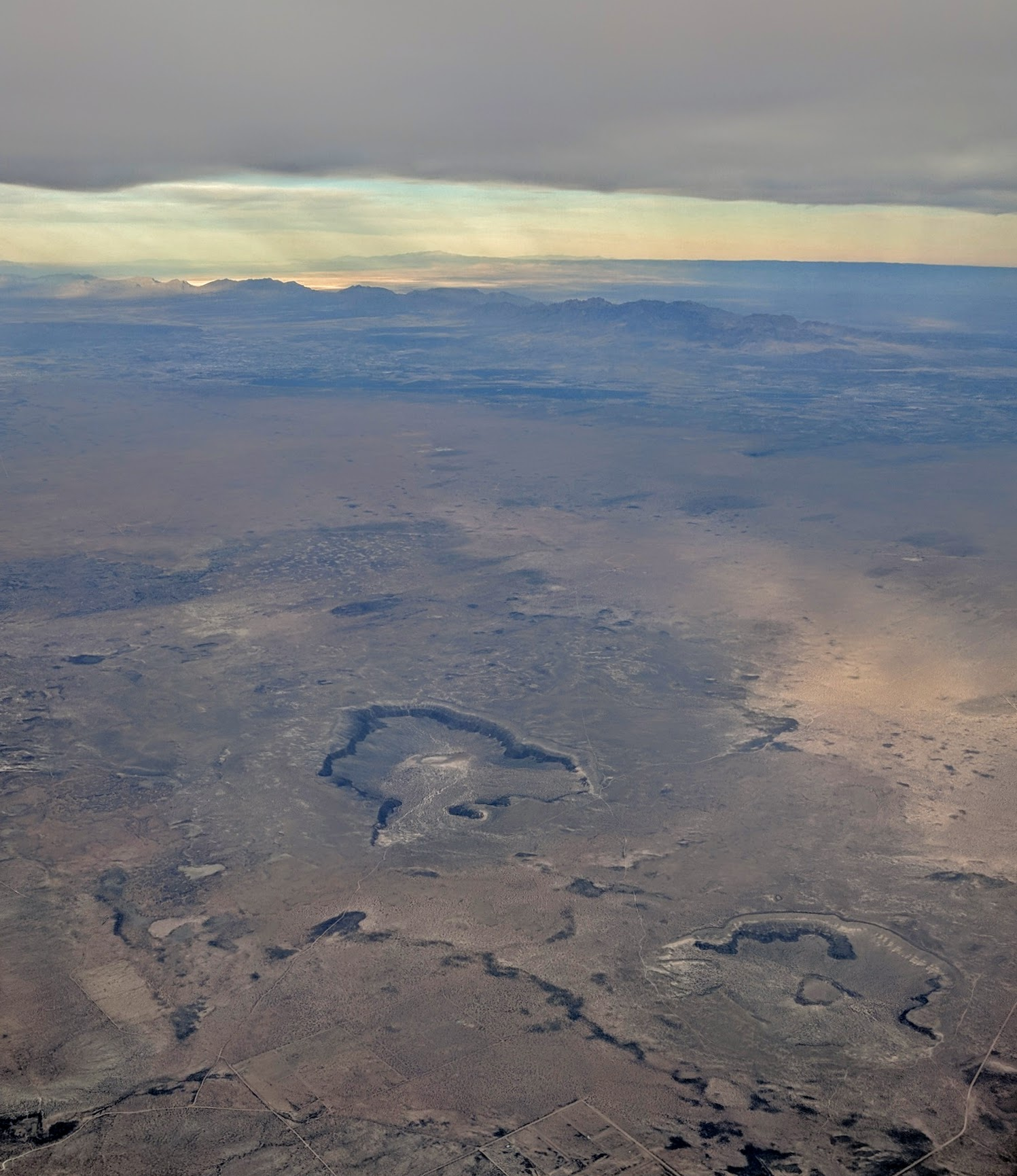
Kilbourne Hole (center) and Hunt's Hole (lower right), with White Sands National Park lit by the sun in the distance beyond the Organ Mountains

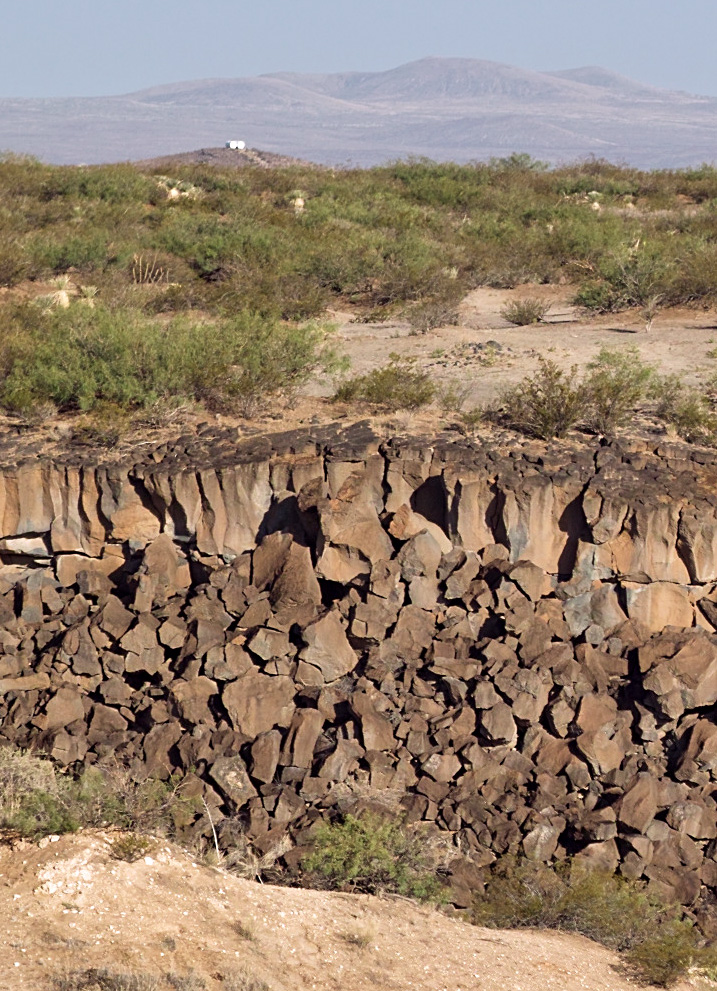
Basalt cliffs of Kilbourne Hole, looking northwest from near the southwest corner. The cliffs come from the earlier Cenozoic Afton basalt flow; the magma that caused the maar explosion was also basalt.

Kilbourne Hole is a maar volcanic crater, located 30 miles (48 km) west of the Franklin Mountains of El Paso, Texas, in the Potrillo volcanic field of Doña Ana County, New Mexico. Another maar, Hunt's Hole, lies just two miles (3.2 km) south. Kilbourne Hole is notable for the large number of mantle xenoliths (solid fragments of mantle rock) that were carried to the surface by the eruption.

Estimates of the age of the crater vary from about 24,000 to about 80,000 years.

In 1975, Kilbourne Hole was designated as a National Natural Landmark by the National Park Service. It is now part of Organ Mountains–Desert Peaks National Monument.

== Geologic setting and formation ==
Kilbourne Hole and Hunt's Hole are found in the central part of the Potrillo volcanic field, which also contains the Afton-Aden basalt flows. The area is part of the Rio Grande rift, where the Earth's crust is being stretched and thinned. The rift is characterized by deep sedimentary basins, recent faulting and volcanic activity, and unusually high heat flow upwards from the Earth's mantle. Kilbourne Hole and Hunt's Hole are located on the same north-trending fault of the Fitzgerald-Robledo fault system.

A maar forms when rising magma encounters sediment beds saturated with groundwater. The magma heats the groundwater to the point where the vapor pressure overcomes the weight of the overlying beds (the overburden pressure) and the beds are catastrophically blown out. Country rock is fragmented and expelled into the atmosphere together with fragments of the magma, creating a deep crater, the bottom of which sits below the pre-eruptive ground surface. The eruption that is attributed with the formation of the maar depression was dated to around 20,000 years. As a result of the eruption, the maar also experienced a collapse similar to that of a caldera.

Kilbourne Hole erupted through alluvium (unconsolidated water-deposited sediments), the Camp Rice Formation and through the pre-existing Afton basalt flow. Like most maars, it has a shallow rim, composed of erupted material that was deposited as thin pyroclastic surge deposits.

== Characteristics ==
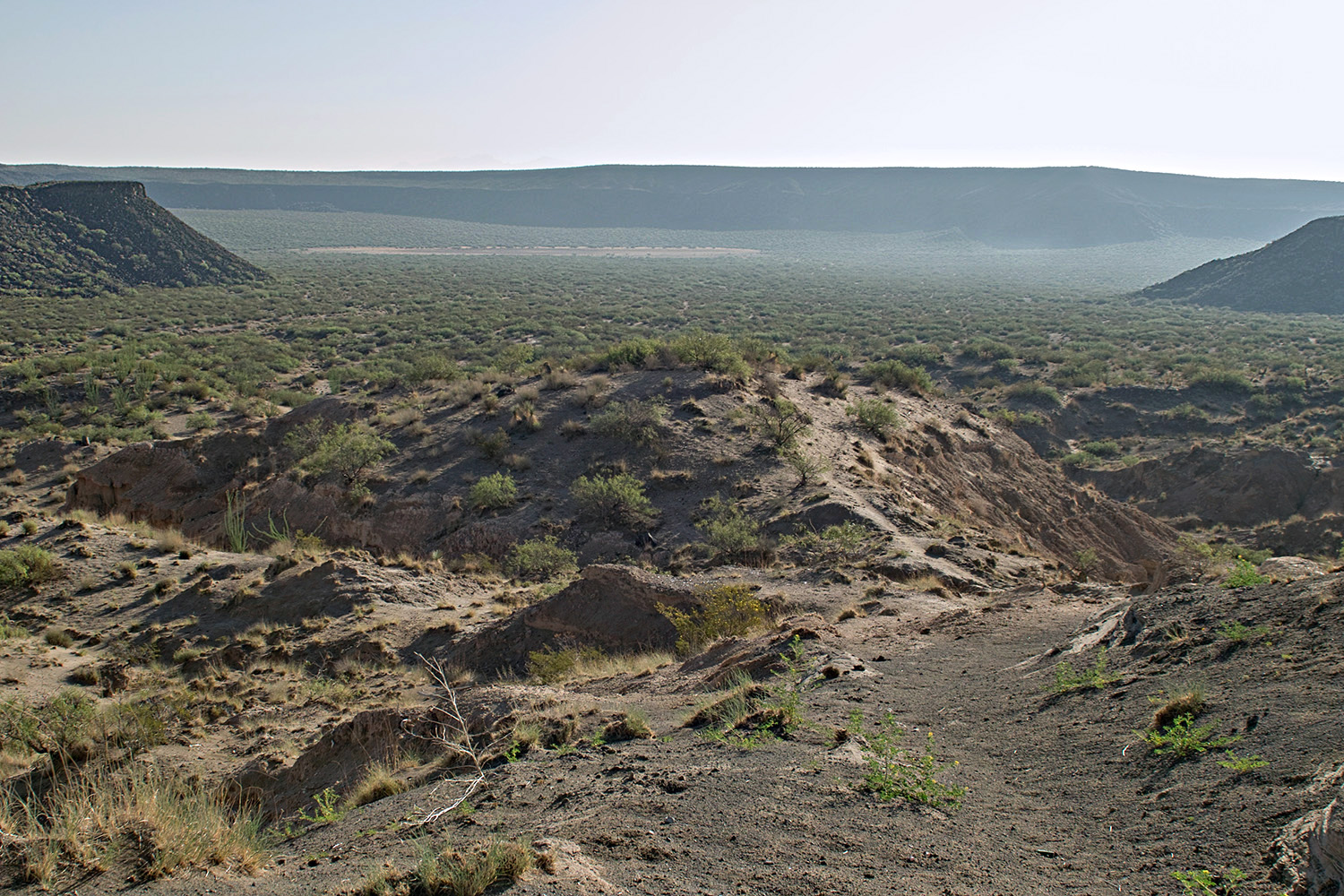
A view of the Kilbourne Hole from the trail at the southwest corner. Everything visible in this photo is the maar, bottom lands and rim with basalt cliffs.

The crater is at an elevation of 4,239 ft (1,292 m). It has a diameter of 1.5 by 2.1 mi (2.4 by 3.4 km) and a depth of 443 ft (135 m).

The hole is over a mile wide, and over 300 feet (91 m) deep, with crumbling cliffs all around except at the southwest corner. The rim cliffs, measuring about 40 feet (12 m) in height, are composed of basalt and exhibit clear columnar jointing (a feature common to many basalt cliffs, including those of Devils Postpile National Monument near Yosemite National Park and Moses Coulee in the Channeled Scablands of Washington), with characteristic reddish-purple, polygonal (mostly hexagonal) columns. The base of the cliffs is obscured by scree composed of blocks of basalt that have been dislodged from the columns above by the work of erosion and mechanical weathering. The basalt flow that comprises these columns pinches out (thins) and eventually disappears as it approaches the southwestern rim of the maar.

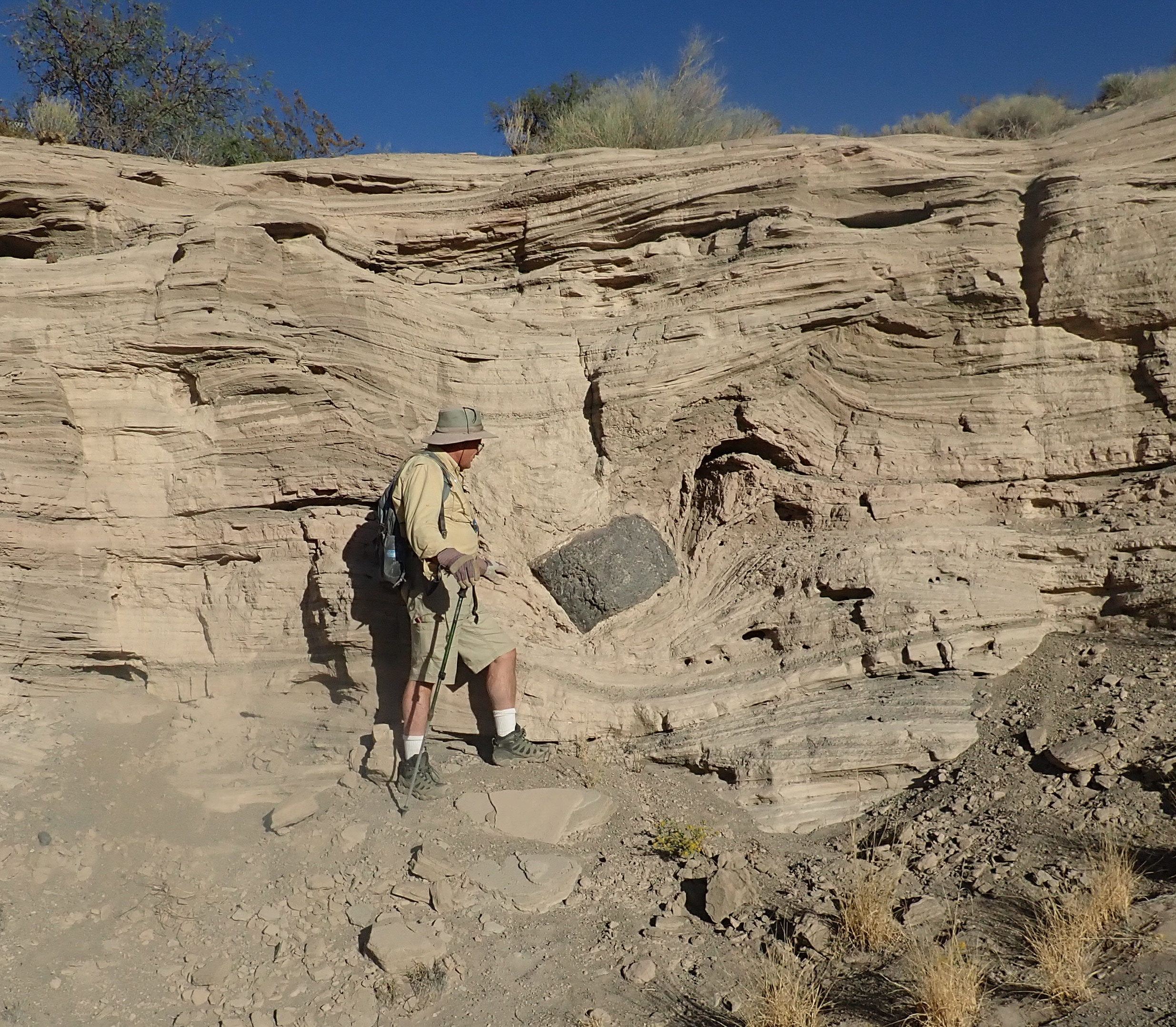
Dropstone in pyroclastic surge beds at Kilbourne Hole

The eastern and northern rim of the hole have low rim deposits of ejecta from the maar eruptions. These rest on the basalt flow where it is present or on older sediments. The ejecta at Kilbourne Hole contains dropstones launched as bombs, usually greater than 2.5 inches across and a large number of xenoliths derived from the lower crust and mantle. These have been closely studied by geologists to learn more about geologic processes deep underground.

Hunt's Hole is a little smaller, with basalt cliffs only at the northeast and southeast sides of the crater. Layers of ashfall and crumbling sediment also rise about 40 feet (12 m) high, on the south rim of the crater. Sand dunes have collected on the east sides of both craters, rising about 100 feet (30 m) above the desert floor. A dry lakebed lies on the floor of each crater.

== Xenoliths ==
Kilbourne Hole is notable for the abundance of xenoliths in the crater ejecta. These are fragments of country rock carried intact to the surface by the eruption. Xenoliths at Kilbourne Hole include both upper mantle rocks and lower crustal rocks and are most abundant in the northern and eastern rim. Because these are samples of portions of the Earth that are inaccessible by mining or drilling, they are of great scientific interest.

Most of the mantle xenoliths at Kilbourne Hole are composed of lherzolite, a rock composed mostly of olivine and pyroxene. The olivine has a distinctive pale green color in which the pyroxene forms black flecks. Wehrlite is occasionally found here as well.

Deep crustal rocks include a variety of granulites of both high-silica (felsic) and low-silica (mafic) compositions, mostly charnockite and anorthosite. These likely took less than three days to reach the surface from their place of origin, and show pristine composition and texture. Their characteristics show that they were little altered from their formation 1.6 to 1.8 billion years ago, other than some reheating during the opening of the Rio Grande rift.

Xenoliths are almost entirely absent in the ejecta from Hunt's Hole, but xenoliths are found in Potrillo maar to the south.

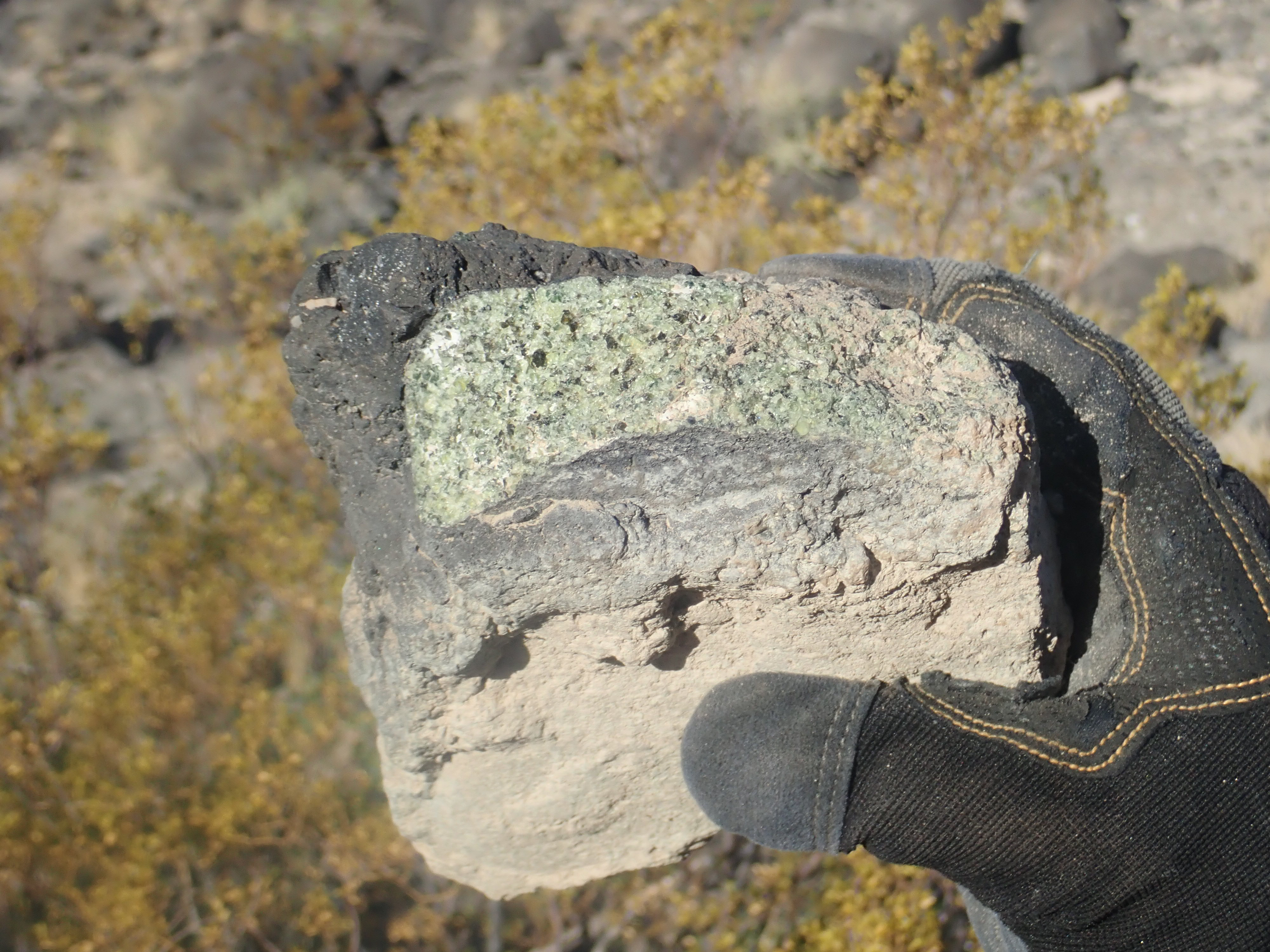
Mantle xenolith embedded in basalt

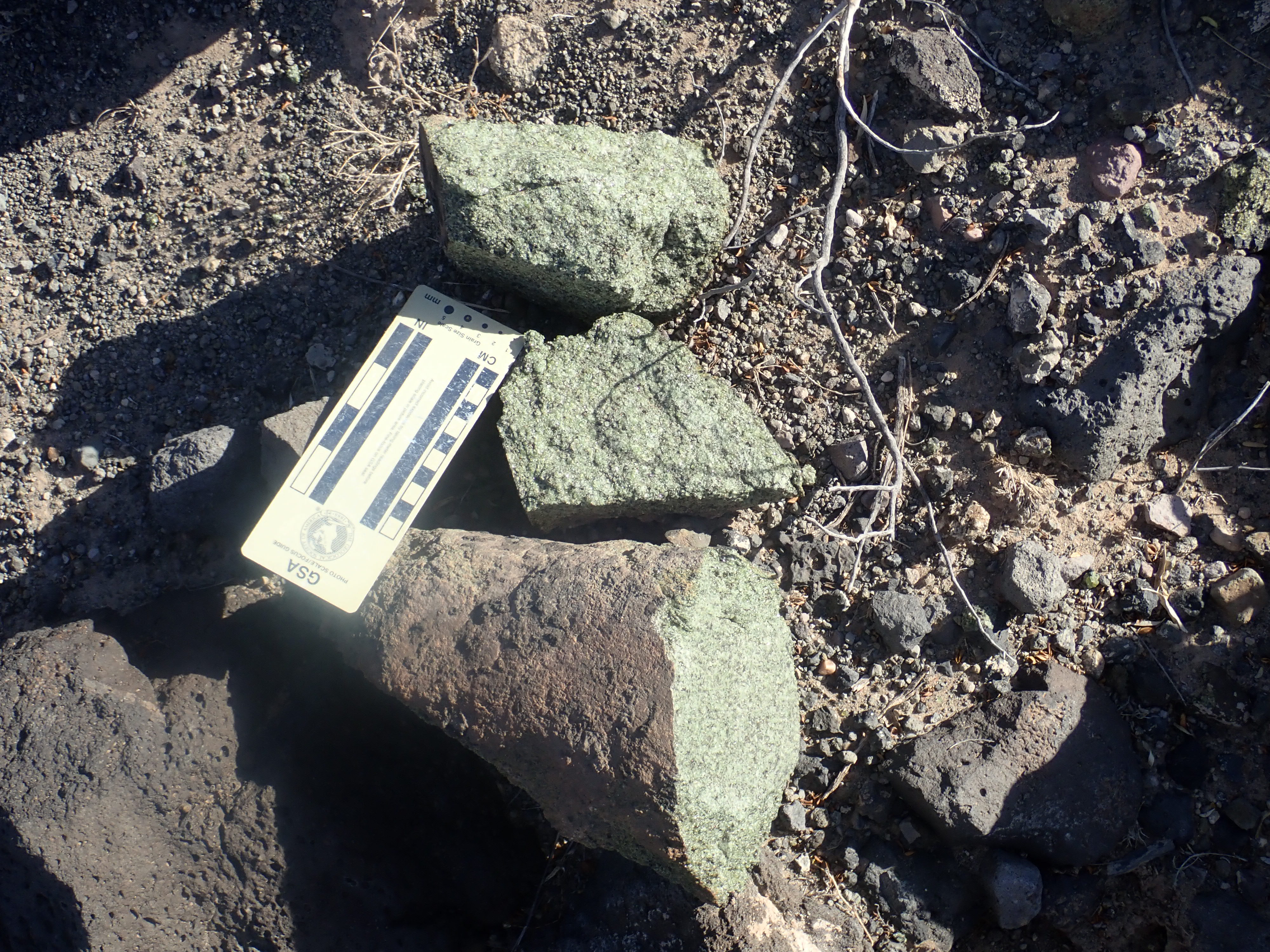
Mantle xenoliths

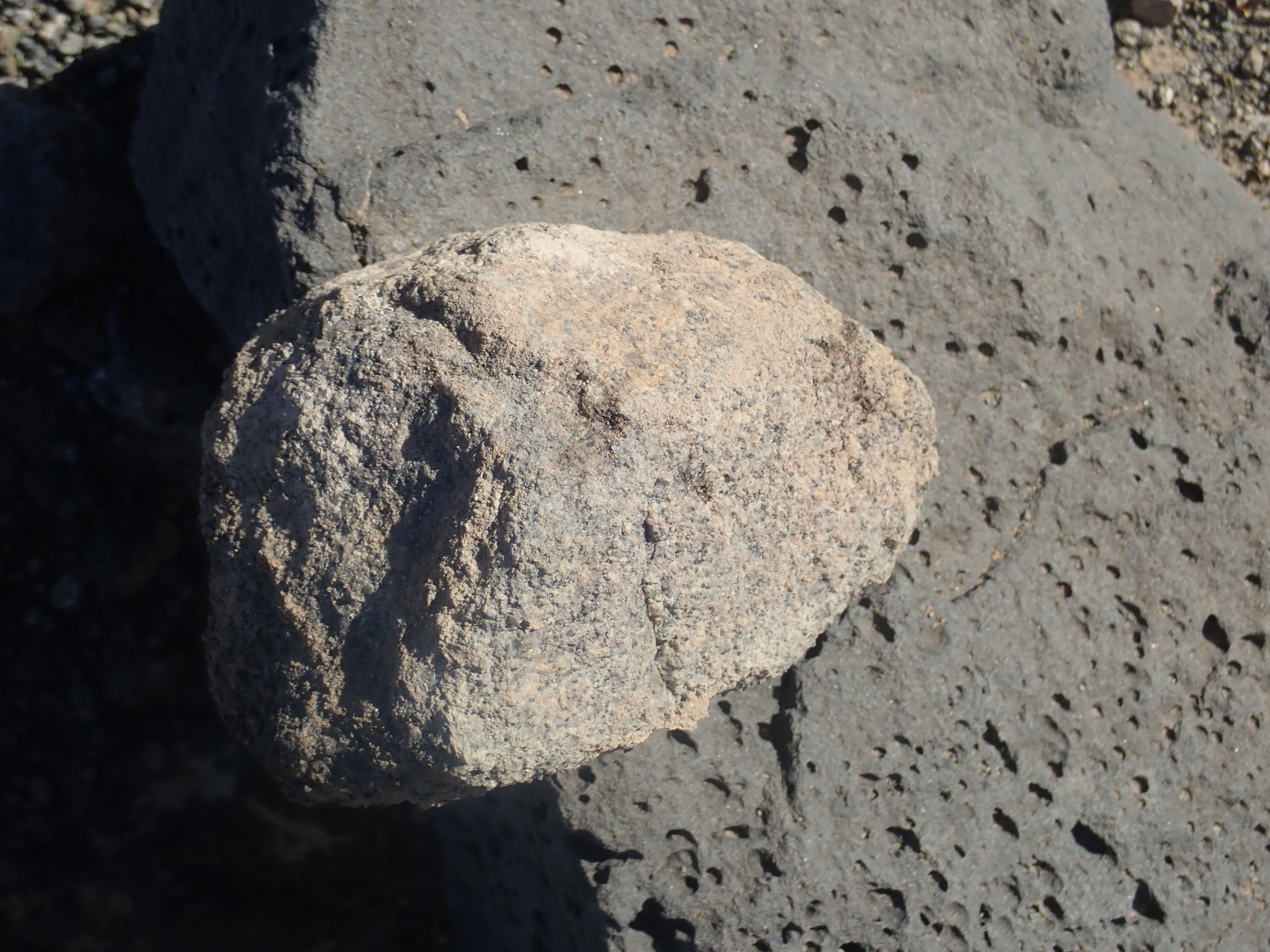
Lower crust xenolith

== NASA training ==
NASA geologically trained the Apollo Astronauts in April and November 1969, June 1970, and January and December 1971. Astronauts who would use this training on the Moon included Apollo 12's Pete Conrad and Alan Bean, Apollo 14's Alan Shepard and Edgar Mitchell, Apollo 15's David Scott and James Irwin, Apollo 16's John Young and Charlie Duke, and Apollo 17's Gene Cernan and Jack Schmitt.

In 2017, a NASA field team visited the hole to test various instruments that are planned to be used in future space missions. Jack Schmitt attended the tests, as well as astronaut Barry Wilmore who was there to assist in simulated moonwalks at the hole.

General location of Kilbourne Hole, Doña Ana County, New Mexico

== Access ==
Kilbourne Hole is located within Organ Mountains–Desert Peaks National Monument and administered by the Bureau of Land Management. It is accessed via Doña Ana County Road A-011, driving 8 miles (13 km) west from the railroad. The hole is "on the right, past the big tan dirt bank." Much of the land inside the hole is private property, and collecting rocks from the location is illegal. Hunt's Hole is about 2 miles (3.2 km) south on A-013.

== See also ==
- List of National Natural Landmarks in New Mexico

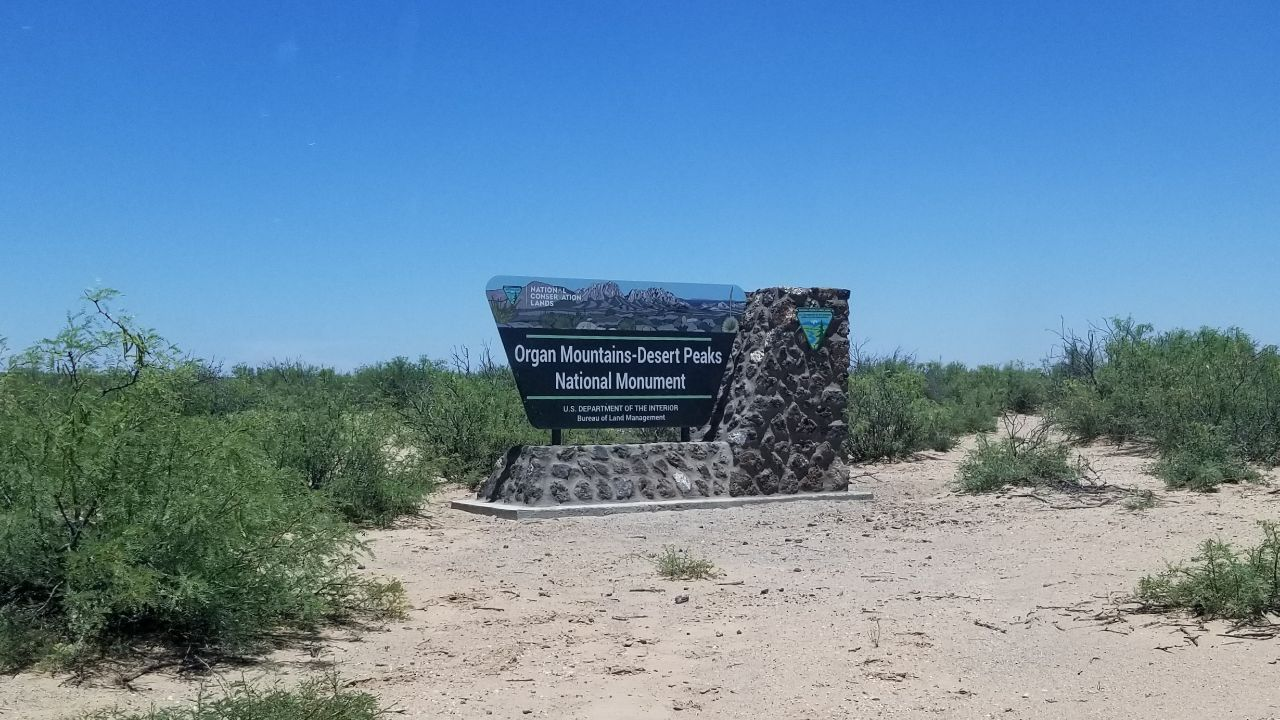
BLM sign on the road to Kilbourne Hole
