= Organ Mountains–Desert Peaks National Monument =

Protected area in New Mexico, US

- Location within the United States
- Interactive map of Organ Mountains–Desert Peaks National Monument
- Location: Doña Ana County, New Mexico, United States
- Nearest city: Las Cruces, NM
- Coordinates: 32°19′34″N 106°33′18″W
- Area: 496,330 acres (200,860 ha)
- Established: May 21, 2014
- Governing body: Bureau of Land Management
- Website: Organ Mountains–Desert Peaks National Monument

U.S. National Monument

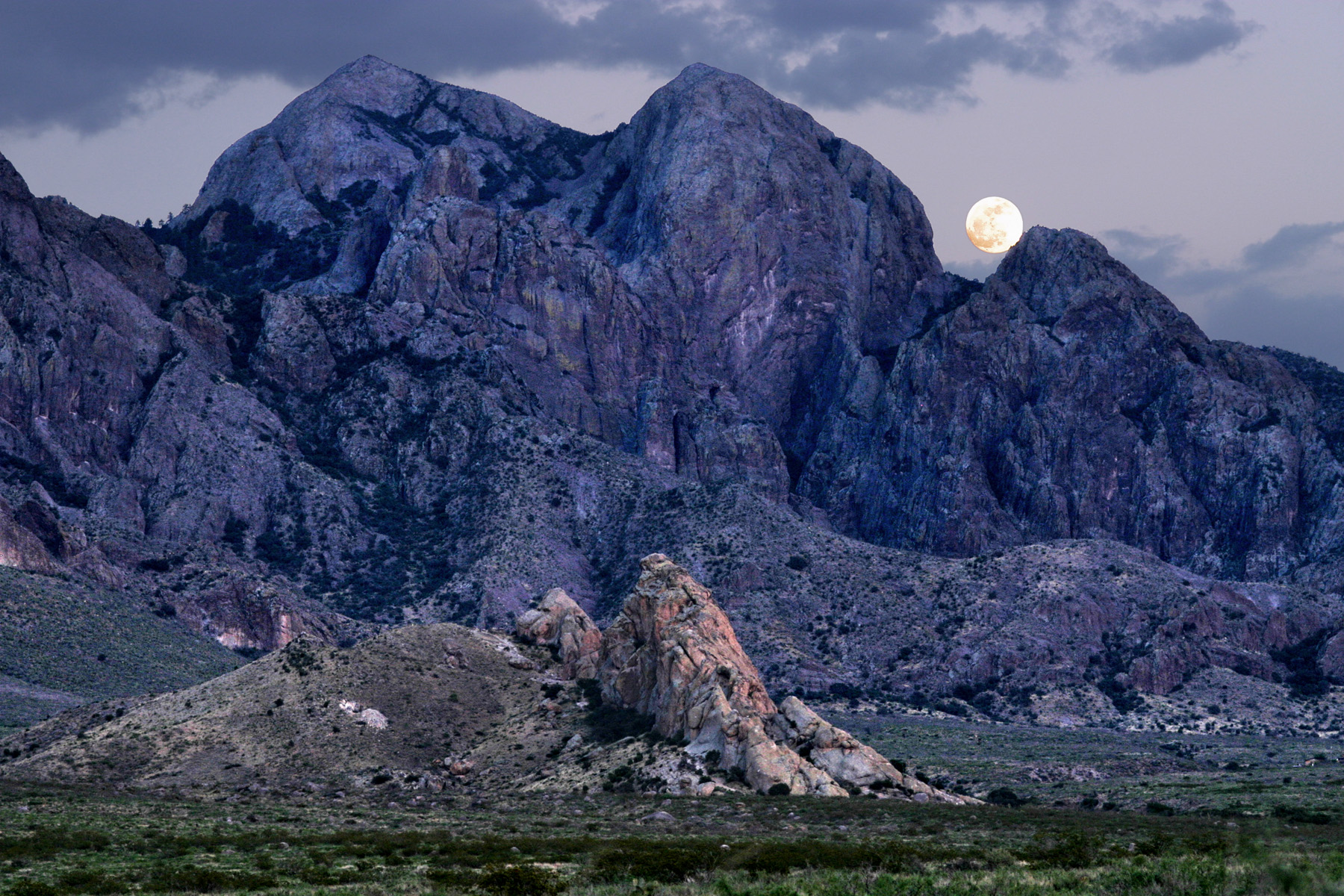
Moonrise over Organ Mountains–Desert Peaks National Monument

The Organ Mountains–Desert Peaks National Monument is a United States national monument in the state of New Mexico, managed by the Bureau of Land Management as part of the National Landscape Conservation System.

== Description ==
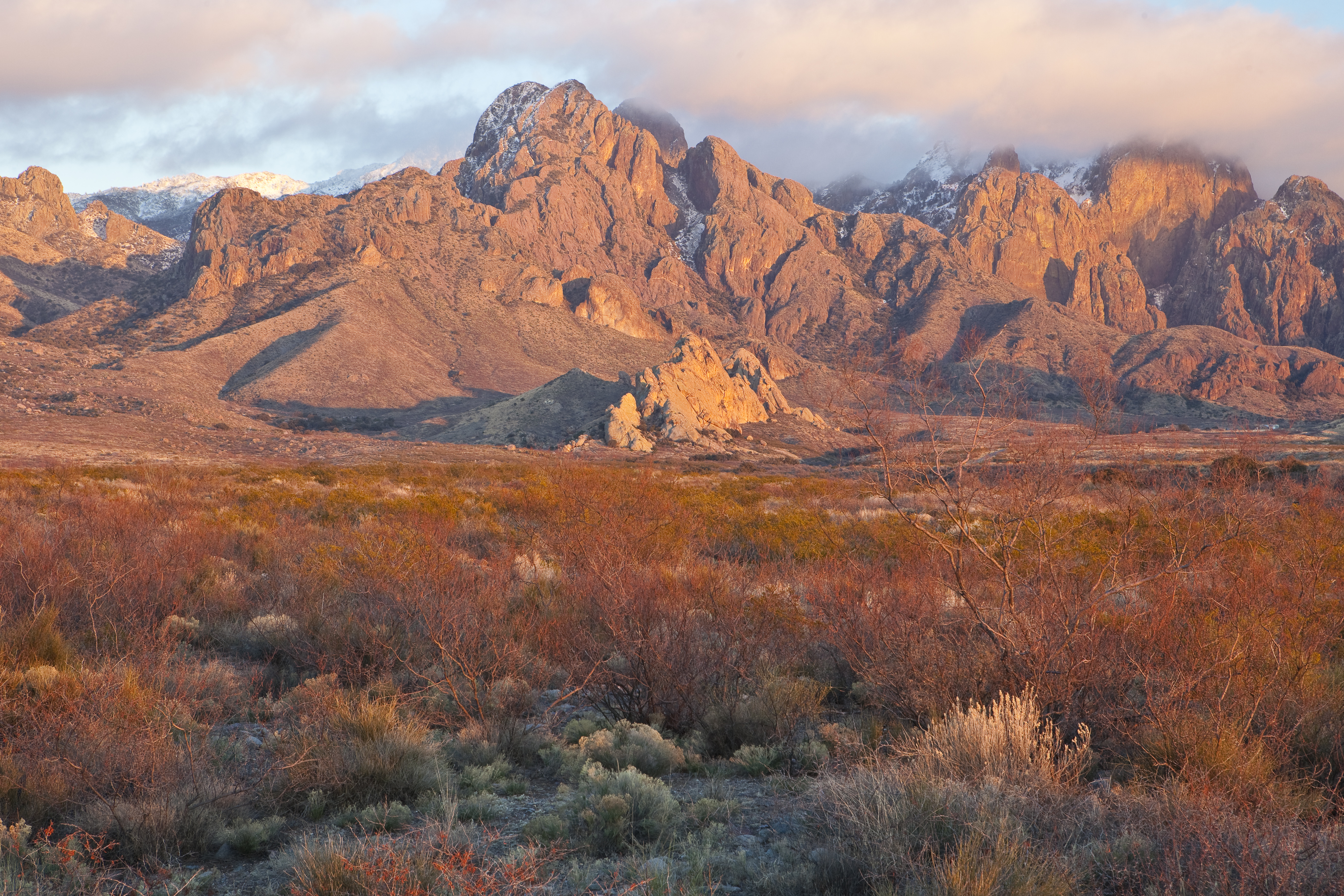
Organ Mountains

The 496,330-acre (200,860 ha) monument is located in the Mesilla Valley in southern New Mexico, surrounding the city of Las Cruces in Doña Ana County. The protected area includes several mountain ranges of the Chihuahuan Desert. The five identified as being within the national monument are the Robledo Mountains, Sierra de las Uvas, Doña Ana Mountains, Organ Mountains and Potrillo Mountains. The Prehistoric Trackways National Monument is nearby.

The monument protects a large variety of geological, paleontological and archaeological resources. Organ Mountains–Desert Peaks protects many archaeological and cultural sites of interest. Before the Gadsden Purchase of 1853, this land included the border between Mexico and the United States. There are 243 known archaeological sites within the monument, including some of the earliest Native American settlements and petroglyphs known from three different tribes. The land also includes Shelter Cave and Conkling Cavern and the Aden Lava Flow Wilderness. Fossils of ground sloths have been found in the area.

The land was used by William H. Bonney, better known as the outlaw Billy the Kid, and Geronimo, a leader during the Apache Wars, both of whom lived in various parts of New Mexico in the 19th century. It is said that Billy the Kid visited "Outlaw Rock", and there is a cave known as "Geronimo's Rock". The monument also includes 22 miles (35 km) of the historic Butterfield Stagecoach Trail.

The monument includes sites where World War II bombers practiced their targeting, as well as Kilbourne Hole in the Potrillo volcanic field, where American astronauts trained for lunar missions in the 1960s.

A land swap was arranged in 2025 with New Mexico State Land Office for about 85,000 state-owned acres of minerals and surface on state trust lands that existed in a checkerboard pattern within the monument. The state would receive Bureau of Land Management land of similar value, primarily around the Las Cruces Airport and industrial park and the Doña Ana County International Jetport and Santa Teresa industrial park.

== Establishment ==
The area was given national monument status following a campaign by conservation advocates that lasted several years. Several bills were introduced in Congress to protect the area through legislation, but they were blocked by House Republicans. In contrast with some previous monument designations, communities and governments of Doña Ana County were supportive of the application for designation. A poll found that 60 percent of the local voters favored establishing this land as a 500,000-acre national monument (200,000 ha).

President Barack Obama designated the monument on May 21, 2014. Half of the monument is designated wilderness and closed to development or motorized use.

== See also ==
- List of national monuments of the United States
