= Bitter Lake National Wildlife Refuge =

Protected wetland area in Chavez County, New Mexico, USA

- IUCN category IV (habitat/species management area)
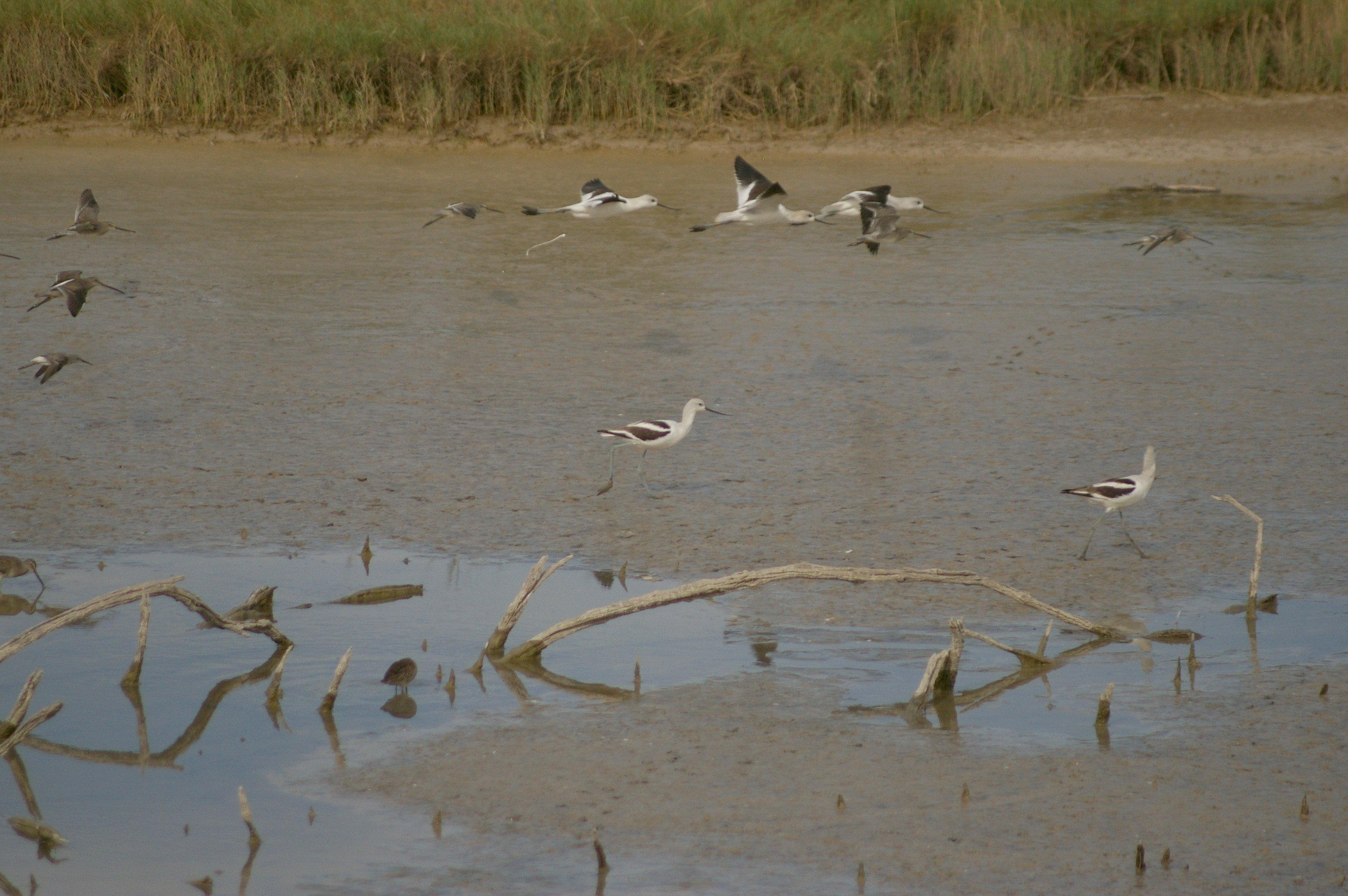

- Location within the United States
- Location: Chaves County, New Mexico, United States
- Nearest city: Roswell, NM
- Coordinates: 33°31′00″N 104°24′30″W
- Area: 24,536 acres (99.29 km^{2})
- Established: 1937
- Governing body: U.S. Fish & Wildlife Service
- Website: Bitter Lake National Wildlife Refuge

Ramsar Wetland
- Official name: Roswell Artesian Wetlands
- Designated: 20 January 2010
- Reference no.: 1917

Bitter Lake National Wildlife Refuge is a United States National Wildlife Refuge located in two separate sections in central Chaves County, New Mexico, United States, a few miles northeast of the city of Roswell. Both sections lie on the banks of the Pecos River. The refuge was established in 1937 to provide habitat for migratory birds such as the sandhill crane and the snow goose, but it is also notable for rare native fish and the over 90 species of dragonflies and damselflies that inhabit the refuge.

Where the Chihuahuan Desert meets the Southern Plains, Bitter Lake is one of the most biologically significant wetland areas of the Pecos River basin. The Bitter Lake Group of lake and wetlands within the National Wildlife Refuge was listed as a National Natural Landmark in 1980.

== Aquatic habitats ==
Bitter Lake includes various unique aquatic habitats. The Pecos River flows across the refuge and forms oxbow lakes. Additionally, the Roswell aquifer underlies the area. Erosion of gypsum by this underground water has caused many sinkholes, some of which have become very deep lakes that are home to unique species. Underground water also feeds springs that are the source of water for the lakes on the refuge. The water level in these lakes is managed by park personnel and is adjusted throughout the year to accommodate the different species of birds that migrate to the refuge.

== Dragonflies ==
Bitter Lake hosts a diverse population of over 90 species of dragonflies and damselfiles. There is a special viewing area along the auto tour route, however, dragonflies can be seen throughout the refuge. The peak dragonfly population occurs in July and August. The park hosts an annual dragonfly festival in September.

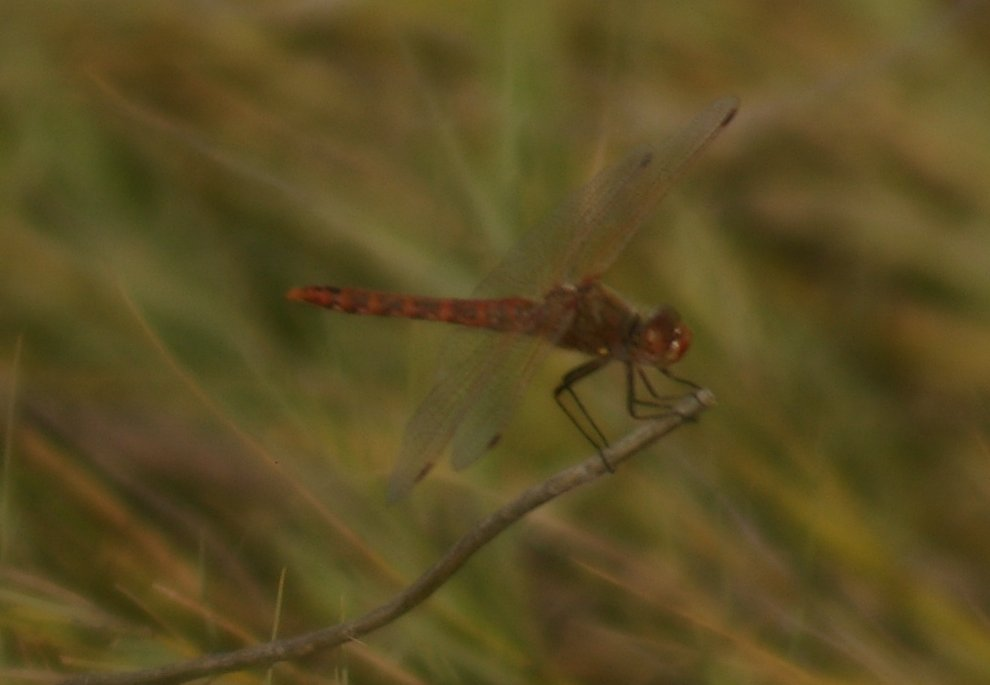
A dragonfly at Bitter Lake

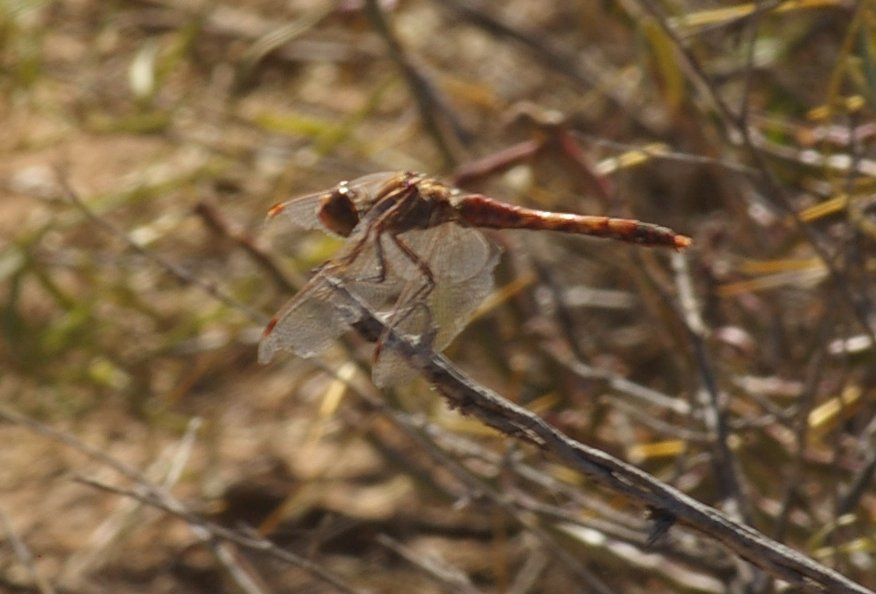
A dragonfly in the fall

== Birds ==
Bitter Lake is especially known as a refuge for birds. There are at least 350 species of birds that have been recorded on the refuge. Bird activity varies year-round with Bitter Lake serving as a refuge for migrating species. Songbirds can be seen in the spring, especially May. In the summer months the refuge is home to many marsh and shorebirds. In the fall there are raptor migrations. Waterfowl concentrations rise in the winter. While some species such as the sandhill crane can number in the thousands, others have been spotted only on rare occasions.

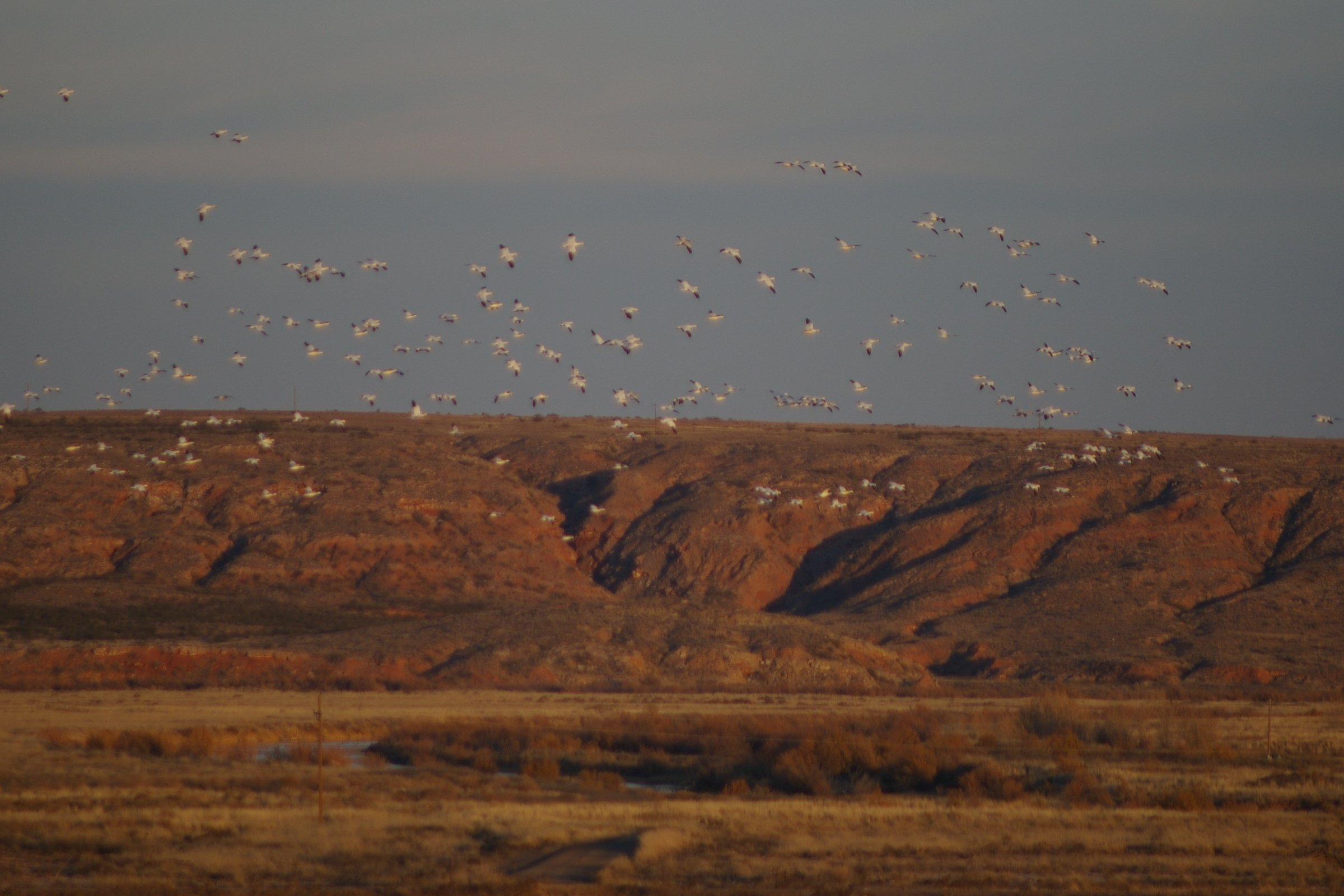
View from the visitor center

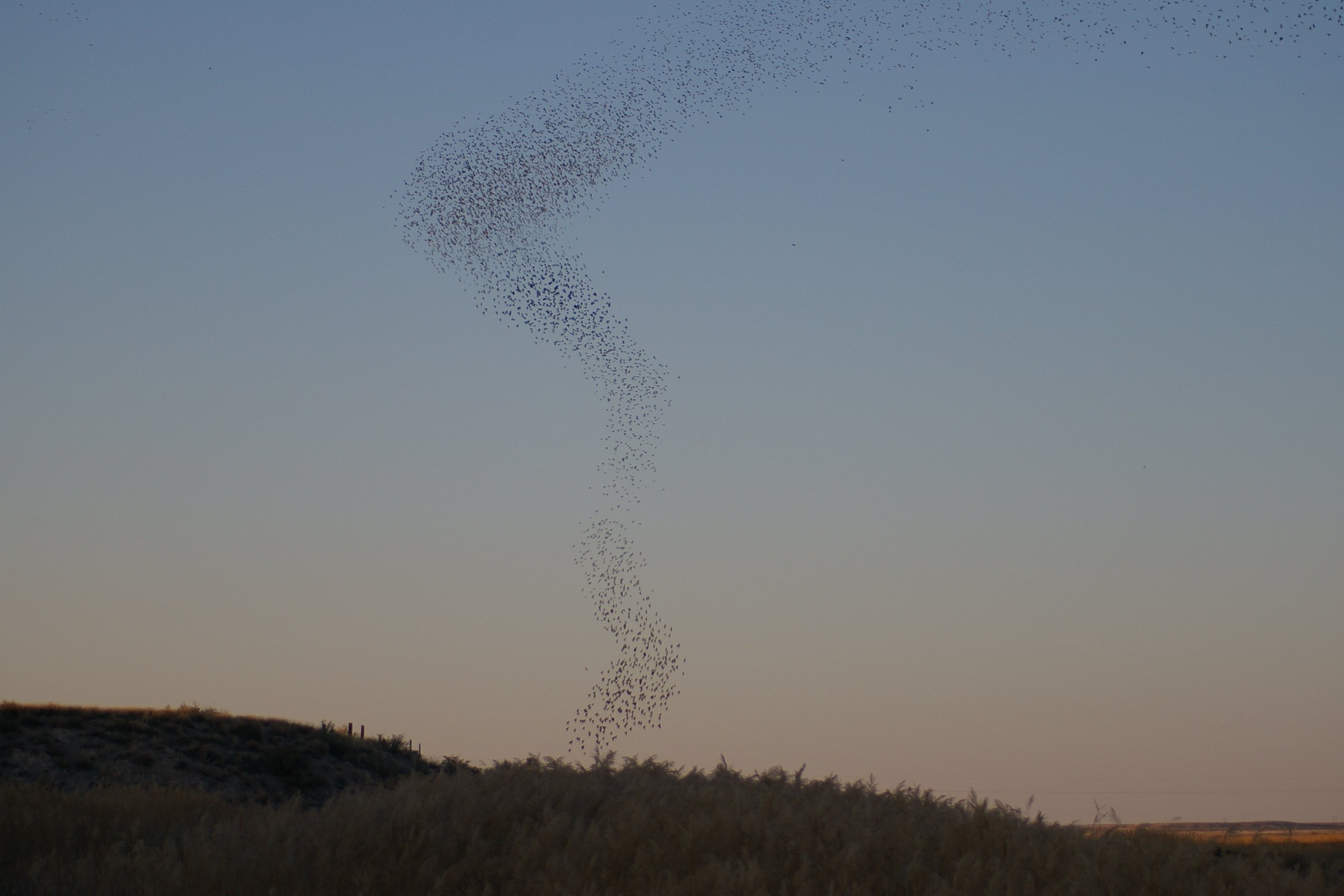
Swarm of birds in the summer

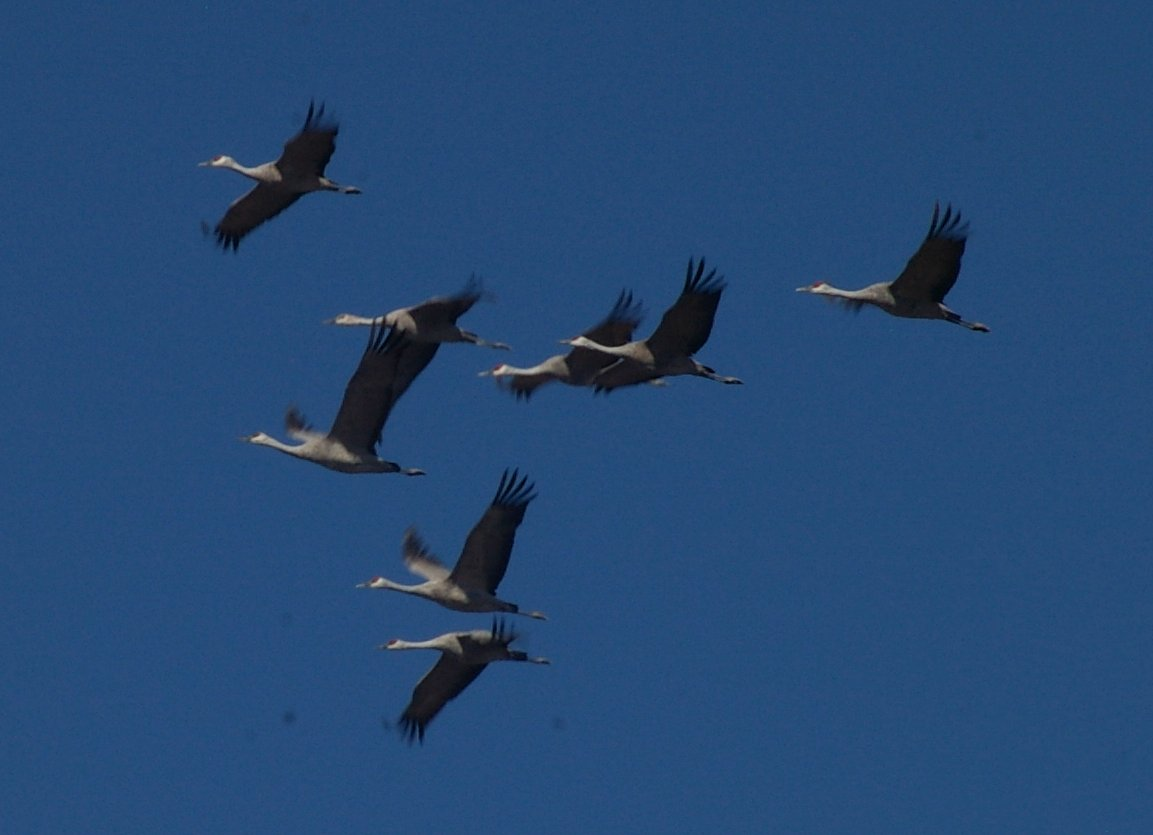
Resident sandhill cranes flying in formation

== Climate ==
According to the Köppen Climate Classification system, Bitter Lake National Wildlife Refuge has a cold semi-arid climate, abbreviated "BSk" on climate maps. The hottest temperature recorded in Bitter Lake National Wildlife Refuge was 114 °F (45.6 °C) on June 28, 1994, while the coldest temperature recorded was −11 °F (−23.9 °C) on January 11, 1962 and January 13, 1963.

Climate data for Bitter Lake National Wildlife Refuge, New Mexico, 1991–2020 normals, extremes 1950–2024
Month	Jan	Feb	Mar	Apr	May	Jun	Jul	Aug	Sep	Oct	Nov	Dec	Year
Record high °F (°C)	86 (30)	89 (32)	95 (35)	100 (38)	110 (43)	114 (46)	112 (44)	110 (43)	106 (41)	101 (38)	89 (32)	85 (29)	114 (46)
Mean daily maximum °F (°C)	56.5 (13.6)	62.0 (16.7)	70.3 (21.3)	78.1 (25.6)	86.5 (30.3)	95.1 (35.1)	95.6 (35.3)	93.9 (34.4)	87.1 (30.6)	77.2 (25.1)	65.2 (18.4)	56.4 (13.6)	77.0 (25.0)
Daily mean °F (°C)	38.9 (3.8)	43.7 (6.5)	51.4 (10.8)	59.5 (15.3)	68.3 (20.2)	77.5 (25.3)	80.0 (26.7)	78.3 (25.7)	70.8 (21.6)	59.3 (15.2)	47.0 (8.3)	38.7 (3.7)	59.5 (15.3)
Mean daily minimum °F (°C)	21.2 (−6.0)	25.2 (−3.8)	32.4 (0.2)	40.8 (4.9)	50.2 (10.1)	59.8 (15.4)	64.4 (18.0)	62.6 (17.0)	54.5 (12.5)	41.5 (5.3)	28.7 (−1.8)	21.0 (−6.1)	41.9 (5.5)
Record low °F (°C)	−22 (−30)	−12 (−24)	5 (−15)	10 (−12)	23 (−5)	39 (4)	43 (6)	40 (4)	29 (−2)	10 (−12)	−3 (−19)	−11 (−24)	−22 (−30)
Average precipitation inches (mm)	0.32 (8.1)	0.36 (9.1)	0.59 (15)	0.62 (16)	1.49 (38)	1.44 (37)	2.33 (59)	1.70 (43)	1.84 (47)	1.52 (39)	0.51 (13)	0.54 (14)	13.26 (338.2)
Average snowfall inches (cm)	1.2 (3.0)	0.4 (1.0)	0.0 (0.0)	0.0 (0.0)	0.0 (0.0)	0.0 (0.0)	0.0 (0.0)	0.0 (0.0)	0.0 (0.0)	0.4 (1.0)	0.6 (1.5)	1.0 (2.5)	3.6 (9)
Average precipitation days (≥ 0.01 in)	3.4	2.9	3.4	2.6	4.3	5.3	5.9	6.4	6.3	5.5	3.4	3.7	53.1
Average snowy days (≥ 0.1 in)	0.7	0.3	0.1	0.0	0.0	0.0	0.0	0.0	0.0	0.1	0.2	0.6	2.0
Source 1: NOAA
Source 2: xmACIS2
