= Potrillo volcanic field =

Volcanic field in United States and Mexico

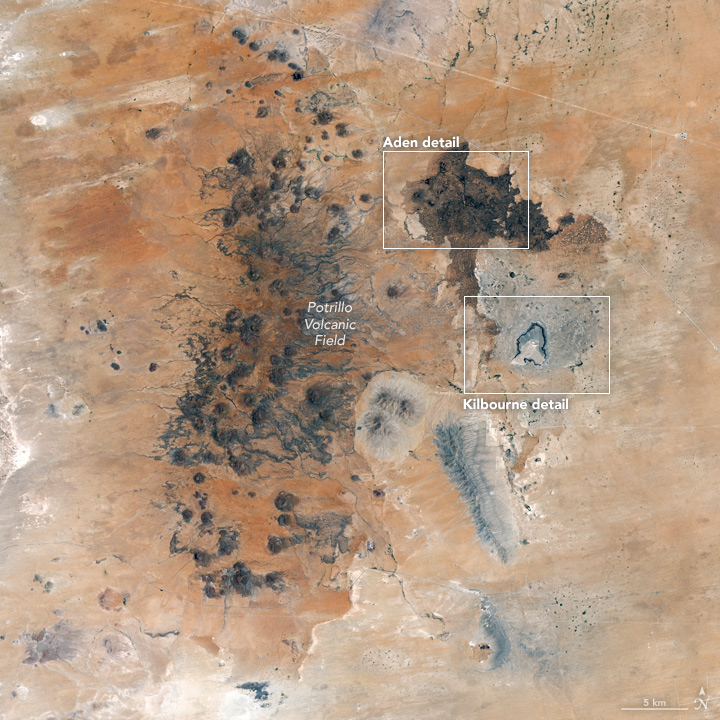
- Potrillo volcanic field viewed from space, 2017. Outlined areas have blowups in text below. Interstate 10 is at the top of this image, and NM-9 and the US-Mexican border are at the bottom (south). The prominent white line diagonally across the top appears to be a major electrical transmission line.

Highest point
- Elevation: 5,561 ft (1,695 m)
- Prominence: 657 ft (200 m)
- Coordinates: 31°54′N 107°12′W

Geography
- Location: New Mexico, United States / Chihuahua, Mexico

Geology
- Rock age: < 2.65 million year
- Mountain type: Volcanic field
- Volcanic field: Rio Grande rift
- Last eruption: > 150,000 years ago

The Potrillo volcanic field is a monogenetic volcanic field located on the Rio Grande Rift in southern New Mexico, United States and northern Chihuahua, Mexico. The volcanic field lies 22 miles (35 km) southwest of Las Cruces, and occupies about 4,661 square kilometers (1,800 sq mi) near the U.S. border with Mexico.

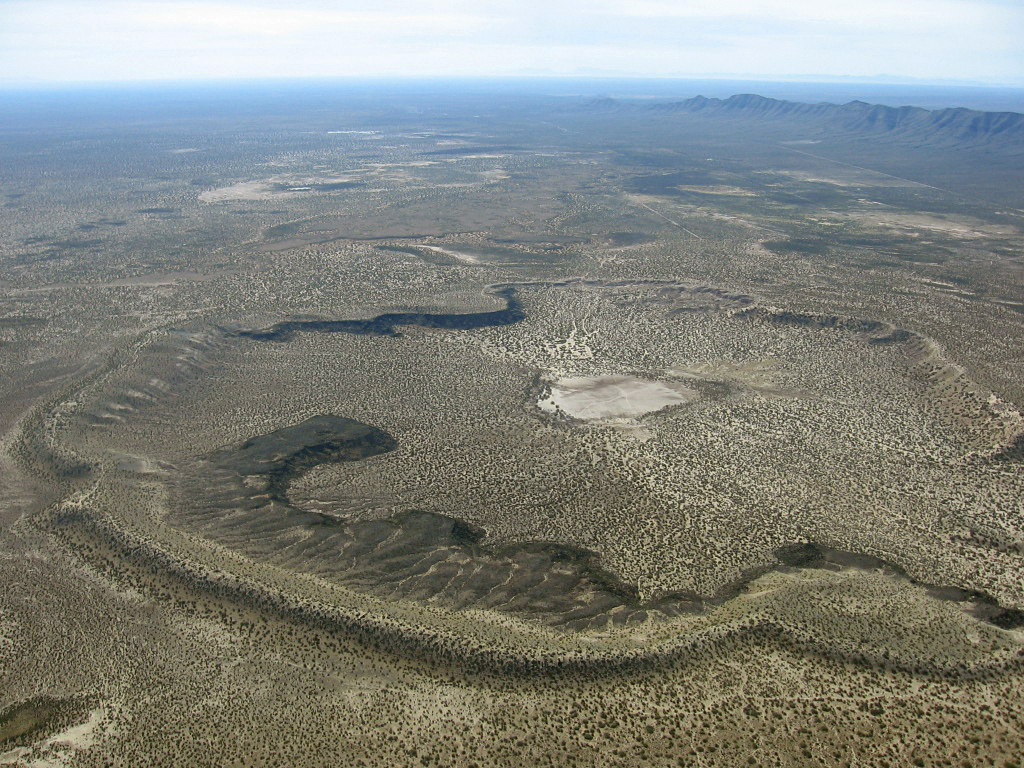
Hunt's Hole looking to the southwest

== Volcanology ==
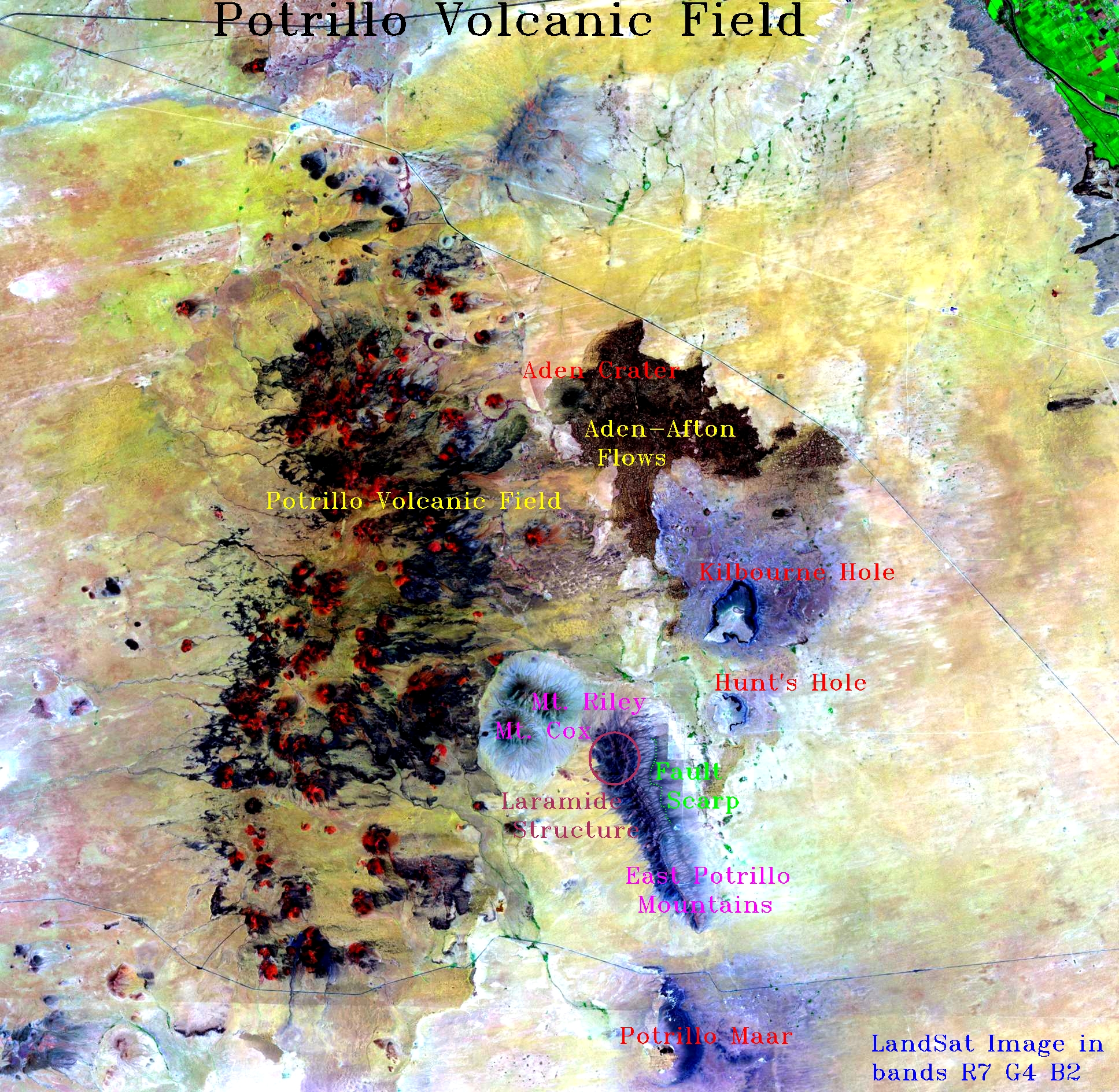
False-color image of Potrillo volcanic field

The Potrillo volcanic field covers approximately 4,661 square kilometers (1,800 sq mi) of Doña Ana County. It is a mafic volcanic field that can be divided in three volcanic regions. The westernmost West Potrillo Field consists of more than 100 cinder cones, two maar volcanoes and associated flows that covers approximately 1,250 square kilometers (480 sq mi). The central Aden–Afton field has a number of young flows, three cinder cones and three maar volcanoes, including Kilbourne Hole. Aden-Afton Field is approximately 230 square kilometers (89 sq mi) in extent. The easternmost Black Mountain-Sao Thomas alignment is a north-south belt of vents near the Rio Grande that includes Santo Tomas, San Miguel, Little Clack Mountain and Black Mountain. The field consists almost entirely of alkaline olivine basalt.

Most of the eastern area vents are scoria cones, some of which have breach flows with pahoehoe surface. Lavas of Black Mountain have been dated as 69 to 85 thousand years old. When performing ^{3}He surface exposure dating, the upper 3 centimetres (1.2 in) of flow surfaces is sufficient for collecting the desired samples. It is essential to collect samples with primarily display flow features, such as spatter, flow lineation, and cooling rinds.

The central Aden-Afton field includes Aden, Afton, the Gardner cones, and the Kilbourne Hole and Hunt's Hole maars. The two maars erupted through portions of pre-existing Afton series basalt flows. The Afton flows may have erupted through a fissure upon which the Gardner cones were emplaced. Aden is a well-preserved shield volcano that at one time had a lava lake, which later solidified and partially collapsed to the west. Its lavas have been dated as between 15 and 19 thousand years old.

The western West Potrillo field includes the Western Potrillo Mountains, a cavalcade of hundreds of coalescing cones and flows formed upon older, thick platform that is possibly fissure-fed stacked flows. Also within the western area are the Riley, Malpais, and Potrillo maars. Potrillo maar is included with the western alignment due to its position west of the Robledo fault. The West Potrillo field is the oldest of the Potrillo volcanic fields, with lavas ranging in age from 262 to 916 thousand years.

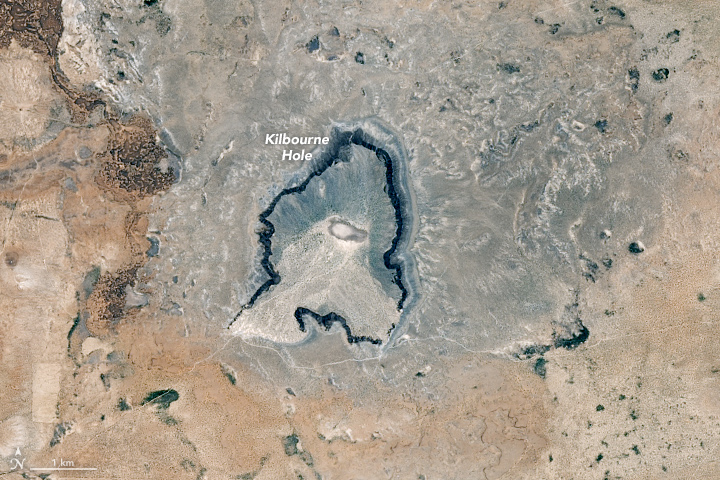
Kilbourne Hole maar, created about 24,000 years ago when magma rising from deep within the Earth encountered groundwater, blowing out an irregularly shaped hole more than a mile across, 1.7 miles long, and hundreds of feet deep.

The central and eastern parts of the Potrillo volcanic field were erupted onto the La Mesa surface, which formed between 900 and 700 Ka. There is a diversity of rock types beneath the Potrillo volcanics, ranging in age from Proterozoic granites through a Phanerozoic sedimentary succession to basalt-andesite volcanics of the southern fringes of the Sierra de las Uvas volcanic field.

One of the lava tubes of Aden Crater contained a ground sloth skeleton, which has been dated at about 11,000 years old. This is now at Yale's Peabody Museum of Natural History. This ground sloth (Nothrotheriops shastense) is one of the few specimens of this age which have been found with patches of skin and hair preserved.

The Potrillo volcanic field has two important xenolith localities. These are Kilbourne Hole and Potrillo maar where mantle peridotites, feldspathic granulites and kaersutite occur. Rock samples collected in the northern part of the pyroclastic deposit of the Potrillo maar, and lava associated with a cinder cone yielded potassium–argon ages of approximately 1.29 and 1.18 million years.

== Structural geology ==
The Potrillo volcanic field is part of the southern Rio Grande rift and illustrates the Cenozoic tectonic evolution of that structure. The tectonic history of the area is recorded in the East Potrillo Mountains, a late Tertiary west-tilted horst located in the southern part of the central area. This range exposes rocks of Permian to middle Miocene age and shows three significant deformation events:

- Laramide thrust faulting to the northeast during the Late Cretaceous = Early Cenozoic. Erosion has not exposed enough of the Laramide structures to determine whether this was thin-skinned overthrusting or deep faulting and uplift of basement blocks.
- Middle to late Tertiary rotation of fault blocks due to either northeast or north-south extension (in the Rio Grande Rift). The system of low angle normal faults that resulted were closely spaced and consequently cut the Laramide structures. The extensional tectonics continued throughout the Middle Cenozoic.
- Late Cenozoic tectonic uplift as a result of movement on high angle normal faults.

Rift extension took place in an intense 30–20 Ma phase, involving low-angle normal faults, and a less intense post-10 Ma phase, involving high-angle normal faults. Mack and Seager (1995) argued that the Quaternary magmatism in the West Potrillo field reached the surface via a transfer zone linking two adjacent N–S-trending, long-lived, extensional structures—the West Robledo and Camel Mountain faults.

== Cosmogenic isotope dating ==
Cosmogenic isotopes are rare isotopes created when a high-energy cosmic ray interacts with the nucleus of an atom. These isotopes are produced within earth materials such as rocks or soil, in Earth's atmosphere, and in extraterrestrial items such as meteorites. Cosmogenic ^{3}He surface dating determines the age of lava flows by measuring the accumulation of cosmogenic ^{3}He since a flow crystallized. It is a technique that is optimal when working with well preserved young surface lavas (<700 ka). Cosmogenic ^{3}He/^{21}Ne is also measured as a check that ^{3}He has been retained by the samples taken.

Surface-exposure ages of samples from Potrillo volcanic field		
Description	^{3}He/^{21}Ne (melt)	Age "Ka" (melt)
Black Mountain		
Upper flow associated	2.6 ± 0.6	77 ± 4
Cinder cone	3.0 ± 0.5	85 ± 7
Lower flow	2.6 ± 0.5	69 ± 5
Afton volcanic center		
Flow resting on La Mesa	2.4 ± 0.3	72 ± 4
surface	2.3 ± 0.3	81 ± 4
Aden volcanic center		
Flow collected 5 km	2.5 ± 1.2	16.9 ± 3
From Aden crater	N/A	15.9 ± 2
Spatter cone in Aden	N/A	15.7 ± 2
Crater	1.5 ± 0.5	17.9 ± 2
Lava lake within crater	N/A	18.2± 3

== Cinder cone morphology ==
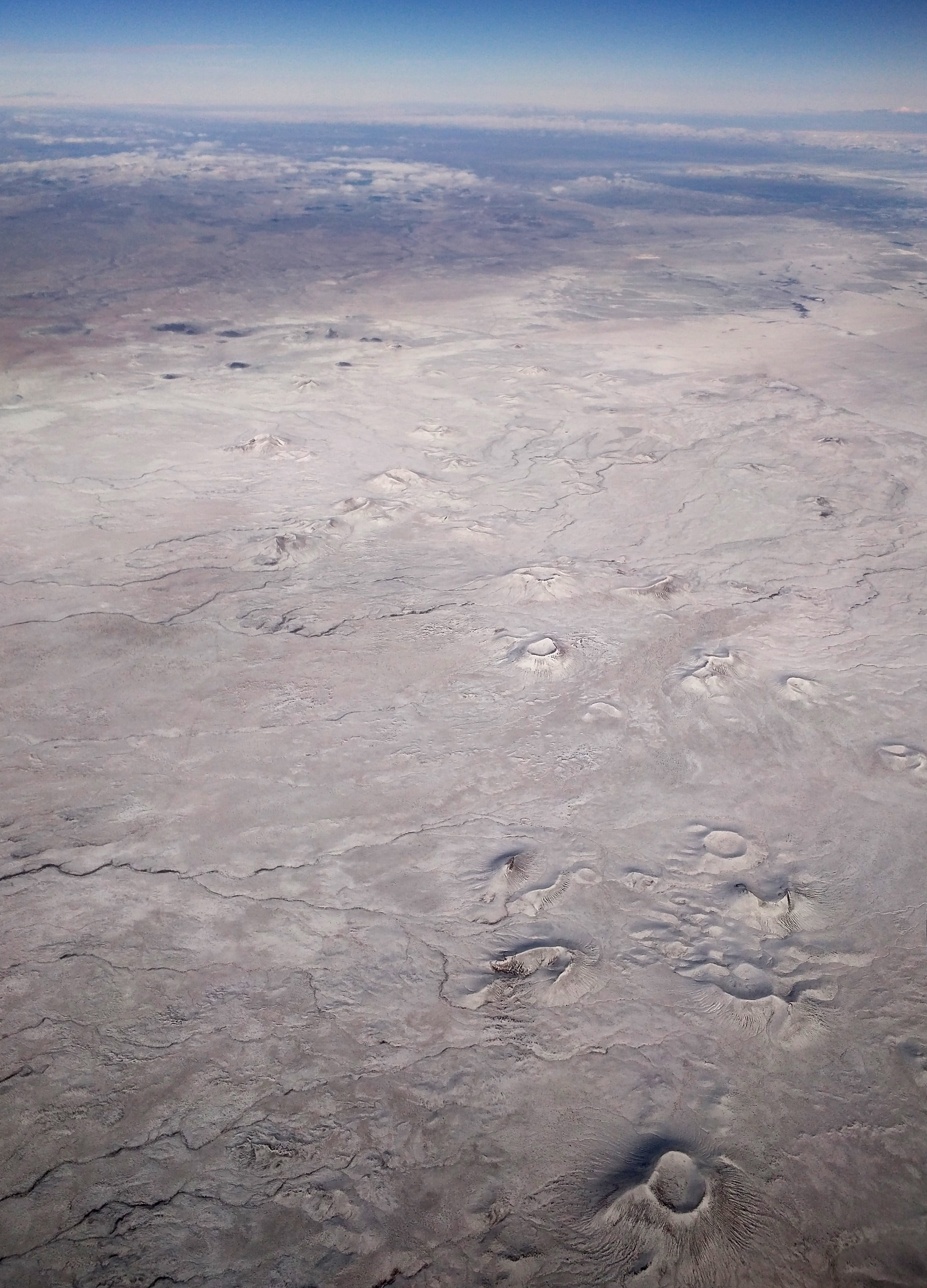
The volcanic field after a snowstorm

The current morphology of the Potrillo volcanic field consists of over 100 cinder cones, ranging in age from 1 million to 20,000 years old. Slope angles of young cinder cones subject to mechanical weathering in an arid environment show a relationship with age. The cones of the Potrillo volcanic field have been used to calibrate the age-slope angle relationship by comparison of ^{3}He and ^{40}Ar/^{39}Ar ages to slope angles obtained from overlapping DRG digital elevation models and digital topographic maps DEM.

There are 3 groups of slope angles;

- Group 1: age of around 250 Ka years old.
- Group 2: age of around 125 Ka years old.
- Group 3: age of around 60 Ka years old.

The new morphologic dating methods suggest that cinder cone formation in the Potrillo volcanic field may have occurred at different intervals and that the field may be currently developing new cinder cones.

== Xenoliths ==
Kilbourne Hole is notable for the abundance of xenoliths in the crater ejecta. These are fragments of country rock carried intact to the surface by the eruption. Xenoliths at Kilbourne Hole include both upper mantle rocks and lower crustal rocks and are most abundant in the northern and eastern rim. Because these are samples of portions of the Earth that are inaccessible by mining or drilling, they are of great scientific interest.

Most of the mantle xenoliths at Kilbourne Hole are composed of lherzolite, a rock composed mostly of olivine and pyroxene. The olivine has a distinctive pale green color in which the pyroxene forms black flecks. Peridotite is occasionally found here as well.

The peridotites range in texture from fine-grained equigranular through porphyroclastic to protogranular. This is interpreted as stratification by depth, with the three textural groups found at 26–42 kilometers (16–26 mi), 42–48 kilometers (26–30 mi), and over 48 kilometers (30 mi), respectively. The more fine-grained peridotites are also more fertile, and some approximate the model composition for primitive mantle. Clinopyroxenite is found as veins or dikes, particularly within the more fine-grained peridotite. Equilibration temperatures range from 908–1,105 °C (1,666–2,021 °F) The xenoliths have P-wave velocities of 7.75 to 7.89 km/s, consistent with P-wave velocies in the Rio Grande rift of 7.6 to 7.8 km/s

Deep crustal rocks include a variety of granulites of both high-silica (felsic) and low-silica (mafic) compositions. These likely took less than three days to reach the surface from their place of origin, and show pristine composition and texture. Their characteristics show that they were little altered from their formation 1.6 to 1.8 billion years ago, other than some reheating during the opening of the Rio Grande rift. Middle crustal xenoliths are Oligocene (26–27 Ma) in age and suggest a large unexposed batholith underlying the volcanic field. Metagabbro and amphibolite are notable scarce in the lower crustal xenoliths, suggesting that underplating has not taken place in this part of the rift.

Xenoliths are almost entirely absent in the ejecta from Hunt's Hole, but xenoliths are found in Potrillo maar to the south.

== Geophysics ==
Seismic velocity data, including reflected and refracted arrivals, shows that the upper 5 km of the crust beneath the Portillo volcanic field (PVF) is characterized by alternating regions of low and high velocities of 2.5-3.7 km/s and 3.5-4.3 km/s, respectively. The velocities increase with depth to approximately 6.0 km/s at 10 km, 6.5 km/s at 16 km, and they increase sharply from 6.9 to 8.0 km/s between 28 and 38 km.

The low crust of the PVF has a uniform density of 2880 kg/m^{3}. The upper to middle crust (between 5 km and 20 km) of the PVF includes a block with a density of 2740 kg/m^{3}. The density at 11 to 15 kilometers (6.8 to 9.3 mi) is 2880 kg/m^{3}. This body is a mid-crustal "welt" and velocities within this region increase to more than 6.35 km/s. This greater density creates a lateral density contrast and in turn generates a long-wavelength gravity high. The upper mantle densities at the PVF decrease from 3280 to 3250 kg/m^{3} from west to east, based on a decrease in velocities from approximately 7.96 to 7.70 km/s.

Coyote Hill and the West Portillo mountains make up the western portion of the PVF, with regional velocities in this uplift ranging from 4.5 km/s to over 6.0 km/s at a depth of 2.5 km. To the east is the Malpais basin, where velocities range from 1.68 km/s to 4.86 km/s at a depth of approximately 3 km. The Mesilla basin is an asymmetric basin that adjoins the eastern edge of the PVF and extends on to the western flank of the Franklin mountain uplift. At a depth of about 1.5 km the velocities in the western area range from approximately 2.4 km/s to 4.0 km/s at a depth of about 1.5 km.

There is increased seismic reflectivity within the crust and at the Moho interface concentrated below the PVF. The mid-crustal shows reflectivity increases between 40 and 70 kilometers (25 and 43 mi) offset; mid-crustal reflectivity is present between 4 and 6 seconds, reduced time.

== Notable vents ==
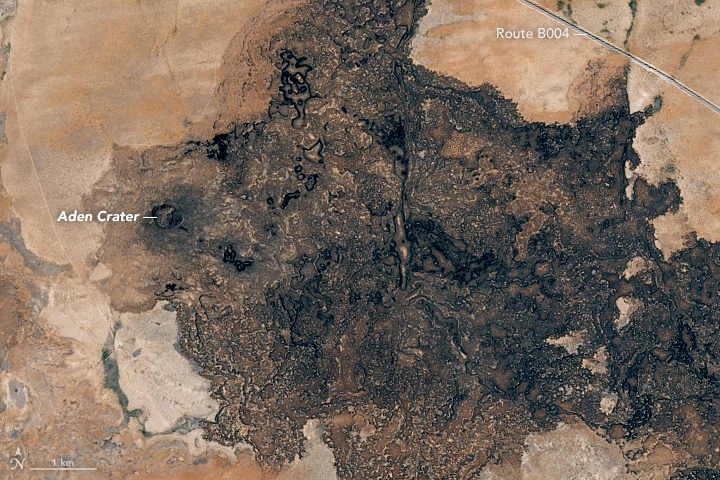
Aden Crater is a small shield volcano, last active about 16,000 years ago.

Name	Elevation	Coordinates	Last eruption
Aden Crater	-	-	16,000 years ago
Hunt's Hole	-	-	-
Kilbourne Hole	1,292 m or 4,239 ft	31.97°N 106.97°W	25,000 years ago
Malpais tuff ring	-	-	-
Potrillo Maar	-	-	-
Mount Riley	-	-	-

== See also ==
- List of volcanoes in the United States
- List of volcanic fields
