= Aden Crater =

Volcano in New Mexico, United States

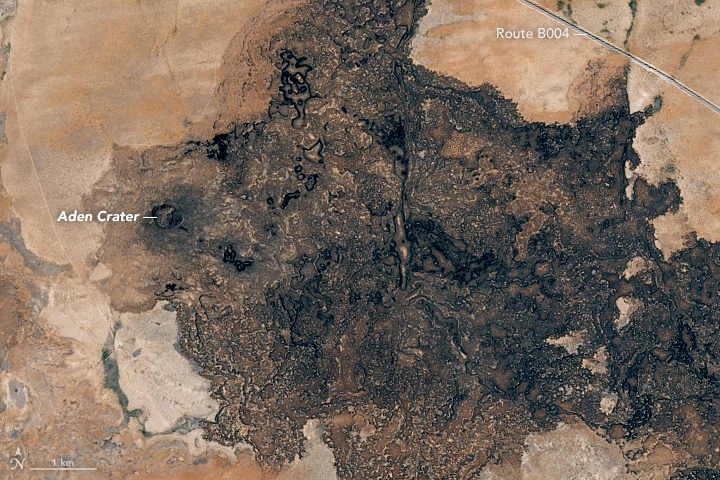
- Aden Crater, New Mexico

Highest point
- Elevation: 4,477 ft (1,365 m)
- Coordinates: 32°04′10″N 107°03′29″W

Geography
- Location within New Mexico
- Location: Doña Ana County, New Mexico, U.S.
- Topo map: USGS Aden Crater

Geology
- Mountain type: shield volcano
- Volcanic field: Potrillo volcanic field
- Last eruption: ca. 16,000 years ago

Aden Crater is a small shield volcano located in Doña Ana County, about 25 miles (40 km) southwest of Las Cruces, New Mexico. It is located in the northwest part of the Aden-Afton basalt field, which is part of the central area of the Potrillo volcanic field.

A fossilized ground sloth, now at the Peabody Museum, was found in a fumarole roughly 100' deep located on the SE portion of the crater rim. Several ground sloth coprolites were also recovered and were stored in the Geology department at UTEP.

No volcanic activity at Aden Crater is known from historic times. The most recent known activity has been dated to roughly 16,000 years ago.

The flows associated with the crater can be divided into two groups. The earlier lavas were more fluid and formed most of the flows to the east and south of the crater. These flows are characterized by inflation plateaus, formed when a solid crust begins to develop around a flow and the lava inflates the more ductile upper surface of the flow. The second group of flows were less fluid and accumulated closer to the vent to form the shield of the crater.

== Description ==
Aden Crater is an Icelandic-type shield volcano, formed by repeated eruptions of very fluid olivine basalt. This has built a very low hill 3–4 miles (4.8–6.4 km) in diameter with slopes of just 3 to 5 degrees. The hill is topped by a crater about 1,400 feet (430 m) in diameter whose rim is composed of lava spatter that dips steeply into the crater (30 to 45 degrees). The crater itself contains a former lava lake, with a spatter cone and collapse pit in the southeastern part of the crater.

The surrounding area has such features as explosion craters, collapse pits, spatter cones, and hornitos. Many of these are found on a low ridge extending to the southeast. A cluster of spatter cones is found southwest of the crater.

A striking feature of the area around the crater is the presence of herraduras. These are horseshoe-shaped lava ridges with the open end pointing downslope. These are thought to have formed where lava was extruded through a fracture in the crust of an underlying flow, perhaps where gas accumulated and promoted fracturing.

== Geologic setting ==
The Potrillo volcanic field is located within the Rio Grande rift, where the Earth's crust is being stretched and thinned. The rift is characterized by deep sedimentary basins, recent faulting and volcanic activity, and unusually high heat flow upwards from the Earth's mantle. Aden Crater is located atop the Aden rift, which runs northwest to southeast through the crater and is traced by collapse pits to the southeast. It is near the Robledo fault, a north–south fault of the Rio Grande rift. Both the rift and the fault are thought to have provided paths to the surface for erupting magma.
