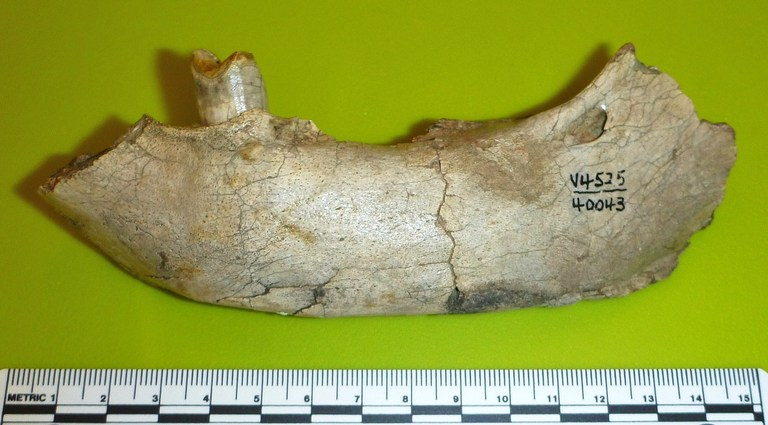
- Mandible of Magdalenabradys confusum

Scientific classification
- Kingdom: Animalia
- Phylum: Chordata
- Class: Mammalia
- Order: Pilosa
- Family: †Mylodontidae
- Tribe: †Lestodontini
- Genus: †Magdalenabradys; Rincón and McDonald, 2020

Type species
- †Magdalenabradys confusum Hirschfeld (1985)

Other species
- †M. kolossiaia Rincón and McDonald 2020

Synonyms
- Pseudoprepotherium confusum Hirschfeld (1985)

= Magdalenabradys =

Magdalenabradys Temporal range: Middle Miocene-Early Pliocene Pliocene (Laventan-Montehermosan) ~13.8–5.3 Ma

Extinct genus of ground sloths

Magdalenabradys is an extinct genus of mylodontid ground sloths that lived during the Middle Miocene and Early Pliocene of what is now Colombia and Venezuela. Fossils have been found in the Villavieja Formation of the Honda Group in Colombia, and the Codore and Urumaco Formations of Venezuela.

== Discovery ==
The first remains of Magdalenabradys were found in the Villavieja Formation of the Honda Group in the strata of the Tatacoa Desert of the Huila Department. The holotype of M. confusum was found about 9 km east of Villavieja and 2.5 km northeast of Hacienda Argentina, Huila. The holotype consisted of a crushed and distorted skull. The femur is based on eight specimens from six localities, including one femur from a partial skeleton that included a skull and mandible (specimens UCMP 3800, 37999). The cranium and partial mandible of both species were originally assigned to Bolivartherium urumaquensis.

== Etymology ==
The generic name, Magdalenabradys is derived from the Magdalena River, in which the type specimen was found and confusum meaning "confused" in reference to the fact that it has originally been confused with Pseudoprepotherium. A second species, M. kolossiaia, was named in 2020. The specific epithet means "colossal".

== Taxonomy ==
Magdalenabradys confusum was originally assigned to the genus Pseudoprepotherium by Sue Ellen Hirschfeld in 1985. However, it was subsequently found to be a distinct genus 35 years later in 2020. Magdalenabradys is considered to be a derived mylodontid, closely related to Lestodon, Pseudoprepotherium, and Thinobadistes.

Below is a phylogenetic tree of the Mylodontidae, based on the work of Rincón and McDonald 2020, showing the position of Magdalenabradys.

- Mylodontidae
  - Urumacotherium
  - - Simomylodon
    - Chubutherium
  - - Eionaletherium
    - - Glossotherium
      - - - Lestodon
          - Magdalenabradys
        - - Thinobadistes
          - Pseudoprepotherium

== Paleoecology ==
The most extensive fossil material to date belongs to the Urumaco sequence, a complex depositional unit that is predominantly exposed in the approximately 36,000 km^{2} large Falcón Basin in the Venezuelan state of Falcón. It is composed of the lithostratigraphic units of the Urumaco and Codore Formations, with remains of Magdalenabradys being limited to the former formation. The Urumaco sequence covers the Middle Miocene to the Early Pliocene. The main components are different layers of sand, clay and/silt and limestone in which individual coal seams are embedded, at least in the Urumaco Formation. The rock strata were formed in what was originally a coastal area under the influence of a river delta. From the entire Urumaco sequence, a large number of sites are documented, the exploration of which began as early as the 1950s. They are distributed over a good 60 different stratigraphic levels. The find material consists mainly of fish, especially sharks and rays. In addition, there are also reptiles such as turtles, crocodilians and isolated snakes, as well as mammals appearing with rodents, South American ungulates, manatees, and minor jointed animals among others. The secondary articulated animals show a high diversity, which almost reaches that of the contemporary fauna of southern South America in the Pampas region or in Mesopotamia. Armadillos such as the Pampatheriidae and Glyptodontinae as well as sloths have been found. Mainly in the late 20th and early 21st century, numerous new forms were described, such as Urumacocnus and Pattersonocnus from the family Megalonychidae, Urumaquia and Proeremotherium as representatives of the large family Megatheriidae and Bolivartherium, Pseudoprepotherium, Eionaletherium and Urumacotherium from the family Mylodontidae and their immediate relatives. As a special circumstance of taphonomy, the frequent tradition of limb elements in sloths is to be evaluated, however, from Magdalenabradys, skull remains are also documented.

The Honda Group in Colombia is known for its diverse abundance of fauna, such as xenarthrans, ungulates, primates, rodents, metatherians, crocodilians, turtles, snakes, birds, and fish. There are 2 subunits of the Honda Group; the Villavieja Formation and the La Victoria Formation. Magdalenabradys fossils are only known from the former formation of the Honda Group.

Mammals from the Honda Group included the fellow mylodontid sloths Brievabradys and Glossotheriopsis, as well as the scelidotheriid Neonematherium, the basal megatherioid Hapalops and the nothrotheriid Huilabradys, cingulates such as the dasypodids Anadasypus and Nanoastegotherium, the pachyarmathere Neoglyptatelus, the pampathere Scirrotherium, and the glyptodont Boreostemma. In addition, the anteater Neotamandua was also present. Ungulates from the Honda Group included the astrapotheres Granastrapotherium, Hilarcotherium, and Xenastrapotherium, the litopterns Megadolodus, Mesolicaphrium, Neodolodus, Theosodon, and Villarroelia, and the notoungulates Huilatherium, Pericotoxodon, and Miocochilius. Metatherians from the Honda group included the sparassodonts Anachlysictis, Dukecynus, Hondadelphys, and Lycopsis, the microbiotherians Micoureus Pachybiotherium, the didelphid Thylamys, the paucituberculates Hondathentes and Pitheculites. Rodents of the Honda Group included various genera of caviomorphs, such as Acarechimys, Eodolichotis, Microscleromys, Microsteiromys, Neoreomys, Olenopsis Prodolichotis, Rhodanodolichotis, Ricardomys, Scleromys, and Steiromys. Birds of the Honda Group included the species Aramus paludigrus, Galbula hylochoreutes, and Hoazinoides magdalenae. Reptiles of the Honda Group included crocodylomorphs, snakes, and turtles, such as the sebecid Langstonia, the alligatorids Balanerodus, Eocaiman, Mourasuchus and Purussaurus the gavialid Gryposuchus, and the crocodile Charactosuchus, the turtles Chelus colombiana, Podocnemis medemi, and Geochelone hesterna, and the snakes Colombophis and Eunectes stirtoni.
