= Archaeomylodon =

Archaeomylodon Temporal range: Middle Pleistocene (Ensenadan) ~0.700 Ma

Scientific classification
- Kingdom: Animalia
- Phylum: Chordata
- Class: Mammalia
- Order: Pilosa
- Family: †Mylodontidae
- Subfamily: †Mylodontinae
- Genus: †Archaeomylodon; Brambilla and Ibarra 2018
- Species: †A. sampedrinensis

Binomial name
- †Archaeomylodon sampedrinensis Brambilla and Ibarra 2018

Extinct genus of ground sloths

Archaeomylodon (meaning "ancient molar tooth" or "ancient Mylodon") is an extinct genus of mylodontine ground sloths that lived during the Middle Pleistocene of what is now Argentina. It is known so far only from a single skull, which in its dimensions corresponds to those of the giant Lestodon. However, the skull differs from this one by its narrower and higher snout. In addition, the anterior canine teeth, which are usually large in many mylodonts, are greatly reduced. The find comes from the Pampa region of South America and was deposited in about 700,000 years old sediments.

== Discovery and naming ==
The only known find of Archaeomylodon so far, was discovered in Cantera Iglesias near Partido San Pedro in the north of the Argentine province of Buenos Aires. The site is located south of the Río Paraná in the Pampa region of South America. The skull was deposited there in calcareous deposits in the upper section of the Ensenada Formation. According to radiometric measurements, these could be determined to be about 700,000 years old, corresponding to the beginning of the Middle Pleistocene. The genus name, Archaeomylodon, is composed of the Greek words ἀρχαῖος archaios for "old" and the genus name Mylodon as the type genus of the Mylodontidae. The prefix archaeo- refers to the older age of the new genus in relation to the mostly Upper Pleistocene finds of other mylodonts. The only known species is Archaeomylodon sampedrinensis. The species epithet is a reference to the locality near San Pedro.

== Description ==
Archaeomylodon is so far known only from a skull of an adult individual. The skull has a length of 59.7 cm, the width of the skull is 23.8 cm and the height is 21 cm. Thus, it belongs to the largest known mylodontid. Archaeomylodon might have reached around the same dimensions of the giant Lestodon, which weighs up to 4 tons. The skull showed an elongated tube-like shape typical for large ground sloths and was built almost rectangular in top view. Only in the area of the eyes was there a small constriction as well as a small widening in the nasal bone-upper jaw section. The anterior section was narrower than in Lestodon, but broader than in Mylodon. In lateral view, the frontal line was flat, lacking a dome-like bulge such as occurred in Glossotherium or Thinobadistes. The nasal bone was oriented slightly upwards. In anterior view, this resulted in a high nasal opening, reminiscent of Mylodon and differing from the distinctly flat one in Glossotherium. The anterior zygomatic arch originated from the maxilla above the third molar-like tooth. The parasagittal ridges on the parietal bone were widely spaced, comparable to Mylodon but unlike the close position to each other in Lestodon. The occipital bone in posterior view had a high and more rounded shape corresponding to Mylodon. In Lestodon and Glossotherium this was rather flattened and therefore broader. On the underside of the skull, the margins of the palate were largely parallel to each other and not divergently oriented anteriorly as in Glossotherium and Lestodon.

The dentition has been fossilized only incompletely. However, it consisted of five teeth per jaw half. The foremost tooth was shaped like canines as in many mylodonts, while the posterior four were shaped like molars (molariform). This is reminiscent of Lestodon and Glossotherium, but differed from Mylodon, in which the upper caniniform teeth were receded. Differing from the former two, the rows of teeth did not diverge clearly towards the front, but were rather parallel to each other. Only in the most anterior region they diverged slightly. Thus, the two canine-like anterior teeth were not displaced laterally outward, but were much closer together. In addition, the distinct diastema to the following first molar-like tooth was missing. Altogether the caniniform tooth was very small and thus in its size already strongly reduced, which reminded of Mylodonopsis and formed a clear difference to the large teeth in Lestodon and Glossotherium. In cross section it possessed a rather circular shape. Of the following teeth, only the rearmost molar is preserved, the others being indicated by the position of their respective alveoli. It possessed a typically flat occlusal surface design for mylodonts consisting of two lobate sections, the posterior one being smaller than the anterior one. The entire alveolar molar row measured about 14.4 cm in length.

== Paleobiology ==
In general, mylodonts are considered specialized grazers. Based on the snout shape of various extinct sloths, an attempt was made to reconstruct food preferences. Here, broad snouts indicate grazers and narrow snouts indicate leaf-eaters comparable to the difference between the white rhinoceros and the black rhinoceros. Archaeomylodon, with its narrower snout, differs markedly from Lestodon and Glossotherium. It is therefore suggested that the animals may have fed generalistically on plant foods.

== Classification ==
Archaeomylodon is an extinct genus of the also extinct family Mylodontidae. The Mylodontidae represent a branch of the suborder of sloths (Folivora). Within this they are often grouped together with the Scelidotheriidae in the superfamily Mylodontoidea (sometimes, however, the Scelidotheriidae is considered only as a subfamily of the Mylodontidae). In a classical view, based on skeletal anatomical studies, the Mylodontoidea in turn represent one of the two major evolutionary lineages of sloths, along with the Megatherioidea. Molecular genetic studies and protein analyses assign a third to these two groups, the Megalocnoidea. Within the Mylodontoidea are the two-toed sloths of the genus Choloepus, one of the two extant sloth genera. The Mylodontidae form one of the most diverse groups within the sloths. Prominent features are found in their high-crowned teeth, which deviate from those of the Megatherioidea with a rather flat (lobate) occlusal surface. This is often associated with a greater adaptation to grassy foods. The posterior teeth have a round or oval cross-section, while the anteriormost have a canine-like design. The hind foot is also distinctly rotated so that the sole points inward. Mylodonts appeared as early as the Oligocene, with Paroctodontotherium from Salla-Luribay in Bolivia among their earliest records.

The combination of features of Archaeomylodon such as the tubular skull, the heterodont dentition with posterior molariform and an anterior caniniform tooth, and the design of the molariform teeth in general clearly refer the genus to the mylodonts. The anterior caniniform tooth is formed very small in Archaeomylodon, which distinguishes the shape from other large mylodonts such as Lestodon and Glossotherium. According to phylogenetic analyses, the greatest similarity is to Mylodon, which occurred mainly in the southern part of South America. In contrast to Archaeomylodon, Mylodon has a more reduced dentition, with the anterior canine teeth completely retracted. Archaeomylodon was found to be the sister taxon to Mylodon.

Below is the phylogeny recovered in the description of Archaeomylodon.

- Mylodontidae
  - Baraguatherium
  - Octomylodon
  - - Nematherium
    - - - Scelidotherium
        - Catonyx
      - - Pseudoprepotherium
        - - Octodontotherium
          - Mylodontinae
            - - Archaeomylodon
              - Mylodon
            - - Paramylodon
              - - Pleurolestodon
                - - Glossotherium
                  - - Lestodon
                    - Thinobadistes
