= Bolivartherium =

Bolivartherium Temporal range: Late Miocene-Late Pliocene (Huayquerian-Chapadmalalan) ~6.3–4.0 Ma

Scientific classification
- Kingdom: Animalia
- Phylum: Chordata
- Class: Mammalia
- Order: Pilosa
- Suborder: Folivora
- Family: †Mylodontidae
- Tribe: †Lestodontini
- Genus: †Bolivartherium; Carlini et al., 2006

Type species
- †Bolivartherium urumaquensis (Linares, 2004)

Other species
- †B. codorensis Carlini et al., 2006

Synonyms
- Lestodon urumaquensis (Linares 2004)

Extinct genus of ground sloths

Bolivartherium is an extinct genus of mylodontine mylodontid sloth that lived during the Late Miocene and Late Pliocene in what is now Venezuela. Fossils have been found in the Codore and Urumaco Formations of Venezuela.

== Etymology ==
The generic name, Bolivartherium, is named in honour of Libertador Simón Bolívar, a Venezuelan military and political leader. The specific name is derived from the Urumaco Formation in which it was found in. A second species, B. codorensis, was named in 2006 after the Codore Formation in which it was found in.

== Description ==
Bolivartherium is a medium-sized mylodontine that was smaller than the quaternary species of Lestodon. It can be distinguished from the latter in having a lower rostrum and the upper caniform which is more curved than in Lestodon, much like Lestodon sp. from the Monte Hermoso Formation (Montehermosan) of Argentina. The diastema in front of the molariforms is elevated with respect to the occlusal plane which is an apomorphic character with respect to other mylodontines, consequently, the alveolar margin of the caniniforms is dorsal to the molariforms, like in Lestodon sp. in Argentina, in contrast to the Quaternary species of Lestodon.

== Taxonomy ==
Bolivartherium urumaquensis was originally assigned to the genus Lestodon by Omar Linares in 2004. However, it was subsequently found to be a distinct genus two years later in 2006. Bolivartherium is considered to be a derived mylodontid, closely related to Lestobradys, Lestodon, Sphenotherus, and Thinobadistes.

Below is a phylogenetic tree of the Mylodontidae, based on the work of Varela et al. 2018, showing the position of Bolivartherium.

- Mylodontidae
  - Nematherium
  - - Scelidotheriinae
      - Analcitherium
      - - Neonematherium
        - - Sibyllotherium
          - - Proscelidodon
            - - Catonyx
              - - Scelidotherium
                - Valgipes
    - - Pseudoprepotherium
      - - Orophodontinae?
          - Brievabradys
          - - Octodontotherium
            - - Paroctodontotherium
              - - Octomylodon
                - - Urumacotherium
                  - - Baraguatherium
                    - Octodontobradys
        - Mylodontinae
          - Mylodon
          - - - Thinobadistes
              - - Lestodon
                - - Lestobradys
                  - Bolivartherium
            - - - Simomylodon
                - Pleurolestodon
              - - Glossotherium
                - Paramylodon

The following cladogram of the Mylodontidae is based on Boscaini et al. 2019, showing the position of Bolivartherium.

- Mylodontidae
  - - Urumacotherium
    - Pseudoprepotherium
  - - - Paroctodontotherium
      - Octodontotherium
    - - Brievabradys
      - Mylodontinae
        - Lestodontini
          - - Lestodon
            - Bolivartherium
          - - Thinobadistes
            - - Sphenotherus
              - Lestobradys
        - Mylodontini
          - Pleurolestodon
          - - - Glossotheridium
              - Simomylodon
            - - - - Kiyumylodon
                  - Mylodon
                - Paramylodon
              - Glossotherium

== Paleoecology ==
The most extensive fossil material to date belongs to the Urumaco sequence, a complex depositional unit that is predominantly exposed in the approximately 36,000 km² large Falcón Basin in the Venezuelan state of Falcón. It is composed of the lithostratigraphic units of the Urumaco and Codore Formations, with remains of Bolivartherium being limited to the two lower and first-mentioned sequences. The Urumaco sequence covers the period from the Middle Miocene to the Early Pliocene. The main components are different layers of sand, clay and/silt and limestone in which individual coal seams are embedded, at least in the Urumaco Formation. The rock strata were formed in what was originally a coastal area under the influence of a river delta. From the entire Urumaco sequence, a large number of sites are documented, the exploration of which began as early as the 1950s. They are distributed over a good 60 different stratigraphic levels. The find material consists mainly of fish, especially sharks and rays. In addition, there are also reptiles such as turtles, crocodilians and isolated snakes, as well as mammals appearing with rodents, South American ungulates, manatees, and minor jointed animals among others. The secondary articulated animals show a high diversity, which almost reaches that of the contemporary fauna of southern South America in the Pampas region or in Mesopotamia. Armadillos such as the Pampatheriidae and Glyptodontinae as well as sloths have been found. Mainly in the late 20th and early 21st century, numerous new forms were described, such as Urumacocnus and Pattersonocnus from the family Megalonychidae, Urumaquia and Proeremotherium as representatives of the large family Megatheriidae and Magdalenabradys, Pseudoprepotherium, Eionaletherium and Urumacotherium from the lineage Mylodontidae and their immediate relatives. As a special circumstance of taphonomy, the frequent tradition of limb elements in sloths is to be evaluated, however, from Bolivartherium also documented remains of the skull.
