= Baraguatherium =

Baraguatherium Temporal range: 20.43–15.97 Ma Early Miocene (Colhuehuapian-Santacrucian)

Scientific classification
- Kingdom: Animalia
- Phylum: Chordata
- Class: Mammalia
- Order: Pilosa
- Family: †Mylodontidae
- Genus: †Baraguatherium; Rincón et al. 2016
- Species: †B. takumara

Binomial name
- †Baraguatherium takumara Rincón et al. 2016

Extinct genus of ground sloths

Baraguatherium is an extinct genus of ground sloths of the family Mylodontidae that lived during the Early Miocene of what is now Venezuela. It dates to the Early Miocene, around 20.44 to 15.97 million years ago and represents the oldest representative of its family in the northern part of South America to date. The structure of the teeth suggests that the genus represents a rather basal form within the Mylodontidae. Unlike other mylodonts, which tended to prefer open grasslands, Baraguatherium lived in a riverine, coastal tropical rainforest.

== Discovery and naming ==
The remains of Baraguatherium known to date are from the Castillo Formation, which is exposed in the Falcón Basin in northwestern Venezuela. The Falcón Basin is located in the boundary of the Caribbean to the South American Plate. An almost complete depositional sequence has been preserved here, ranging from the Eocene to the Pliocene, some of which is very rich in fossils. The most important and best known finds to date are from the Urumaco sequence of the Middle and Upper Miocene. The Castillo Formation is stratigraphy older and covers the northwestern to southwestern margin of the Falcón Basin in a semicircular pattern. It was first studied and named in the 1960s. Among the most important outcrops is that of Cerro la Cruz near the town of La Mesa about 20 km north of Carora in the Venezuelan state of Lara. It is located on the southern flank of the Serranía La Baragua and consists of a Sedimentary sequence at least 360m high on an area of about 2 km². The sequence is composed of various layers of clay/siltstones, in which individual layers of limestone and sandstone are interbedded, in addition to which limonites and conglomerates occur locally. Altogether, four units (A to D from bottom to top) can be distinguished. Especially the three lower units contain abundant fossil material, which increases again strongly in the sections B and C. The fossil abundance was first noted in the transition from the 20th to the 21st century. Overall, marine life predominates in the fossil record, which includes crustaceans, mollusks, fish, turtles, manatees, and whales. Among these, some forms, such as the genus Portunus, which belongs to the decapods, suggest nearshore waters. Moreover, freshwater forms such as the Black pacu or the genus Mylossoma occur as representatives of fishes, as well as members of the Snake-necked Turtles. In the middle section of Unit C, remains of terrestrial vertebrates were also recovered. Prominent among these would be some members of the South American ungulates and the xenarthrans, including the remains of Baraguatherium. In this area, informally called Valle de los vertebrados (the valley of vertebrates), numerous bioturbations can be traced in the form of trace fossils, such as Gyrolithes, a possibly crustacean-like creature that dug corkscrew-like passage structures in the coastal soil. Based on the geological and paleontological evidence, a former mangrove-covered shallow coastal landscape can be assumed, which probably existed only for a short time. Dating using strontium isotopes gave the Castillo Formation an age of 19.27 to 17.21 million years, corresponding to the Lower Miocene, with the section that includes the terrestrial vertebrates likely younger than 18.27 million years. The isolated molars of Baraguatherium were presented in a scientific paper as early as 2004, but their exact taxonomic assignment, however, was uncertain. In another publication from 2014, the authors referred the mandible to the more basal ground sloth family Orophodontidae.

The genus name Baraguatherium is composed of the name Baragua for Serranía La Baragua (also Sierra de La Baragua), a mountain range in northern Venezuela, on the southern flank of which the Cerro la Cruz locality is located, and the Greek word θηρίον (thērion) for "beast". The only species known to date is Baraguatherium takumara. The species epithet refers to the word takumará of the Ayamanes Indio group, in whose language means "sloth".

== Description ==
Baraguatherium is a medium sized representative of the Mylodontidae. Its body weight was estimated to be about 495 to 765 kg based on an incompletely preserved femur. In addition to the long bone, a fragmented right mandibular branch with the preserved posterior three teeth and some isolated teeth of the maxilla are also present. The mandible is missing the anterior section and the upper part of the ascending branch. The fragment is 12.3 cm long in total. The mandible itself was massive and wide. When reconstructed, the two rows of teeth were probably parallel to each other, which differs from most other mylodonts, which had divergent rows of teeth due to their ready snouts. The symphysis extended to the second molariform (molariform) tooth and was rather narrow. The lower margin of the mandible was straight. At the upper margin, the transition to the ascending articular branch was rounded, it started directly behind the last tooth. The mandibular dentition was similar to that of other mylodonts with one anterior canine (caniniform) tooth and three posterior molariform teeth. Of the anterior caniniform tooth, only the alveolus has been documented in Baraguatherium, but there was no diastema to the posterior teeth, unlike numerous other mylodonts. All three molars were characterized by a bilobate occlusal surface structure with raised margins and a shallow depression between them. On the last molar-like tooth, the anterior lobe was significantly wider than the posterior. In internal structure, the teeth had a core of vasodentin, a softer component of the dentine, encased in orthodentin, a harder variety. The outer layer was formed of tooth cementum, but it was thinner in Baraguatherium than in other mylodonts. As in all sloths, the enamel was absent. The length of the molar row was 6.8 cm. The second molar-like tooth was the largest tooth at 2.1 cm long and 1.7 cm wide, but all teeth were similar in dimensions.

The femur is preserved at about 35 cm in length, which is about 60 to 70% of the total length. When reconstructed, it may have been between 41 and 46 cm long. The shaft showed a board-like flattened shape characteristic of large ground sloths. The condyle and the greater trochanter have not survived, and the third trochanter was located at the middle of the shaft and pointed backwards. The knee joint was characterized by a larger inner (middle) and smaller outer (lateral) joint roll.

== Paleobiology ==
Due to the large femur it can be assumed that Baraguatherium belonged to the ground-dwelling sloths and moved quadrupedally. The geological-paleontological evidence points as habitat to a coastal tropical rainforest, which was crossed by numerous rivers. In this respect Baraguatherium differed from other mylodonts, which rather preferred open grasslands.

== Classification ==
Baraguatherium is an extinct genus of the extinct family Mylodontidae. The Mylodontidae represent a branch of the suborder of sloths (Folivora). Within this they are often grouped together with the Orophodontidae and the Scelidotheriidae in the superfamily Mylodontoidea (sometimes, however, the Scelidotheriidae and the Orophodontidae are considered only as a subfamily of the Mylodontidae). In a classical view, based on skeletal anatomical studies, the Mylodontoidea in turn represent one of the two major evolutionary lineages of sloths, along with the Megatherioidea. Molecular genetic studies and protein analyses assign a third to these two groups, the Megalocnoidea. Within the Mylodontoidea are the two-fingered sloths (Choloepus), one of the two extant sloth genera. The Mylodontidae form one of the most diverse groups within the sloths. Prominent features are found in their high-crowned teeth, which deviate from those of the Megatherioidea with a rather flat (lobate) occlusal surface. This is often associated with a greater adaptation to grassy foods. The posterior teeth have a round or oval cross-section, while the anteriormost have a canine-like design. The hind foot is also distinctly rotated so that the sole points inward. Mylodonts appeared as early as the Oligocene, with Paroctodontotherium from Salla-Luribay in Bolivia among their earliest records.

- Mylodontidae
  - Baraguatherium
  - Octomylodon
  - - Nematherium
    - - - Scelidotherium
        - Catonyx
      - - Pseudoprepotherium
        - - Octodontotherium
          - Mylodontinae
            - - Archaeomylodon
              - Mylodon
            - - Paramylodon
              - - Pleurolestodon
                - - Glossotherium
                  - - Lestodon
                    - Thinobadistes
