= Simomylodon =

Simomylodon Temporal range: Late Miocene-Middle Pliocene (Montehermosan-Chapadmalalan) ~5.4–4.0 Ma

Scientific classification
- Kingdom: Animalia
- Phylum: Chordata
- Class: Mammalia
- Order: Pilosa
- Family: †Mylodontidae
- Tribe: †Mylodontini
- Genus: †Simomylodon; Saint-André et al. 2010
- Species: †S. uccasamamensis

Binomial name
- †Simomylodon uccasamamensis Saint-André et al. 2010

Extinct genus of ground sloths

Simomylodon is an extinct genus of ground sloths from the family Mylodontidae. It lived from the Late Miocene to the Middle Pliocene of what is now Bolivia and Argentina, 5.3 to 2.8 million years ago. The most important find material comes from the central Altiplano in Bolivia and includes several skulls and dentition remains. Thus, the so far documented body skeleton is the best known and most significant of a Miocene representative of the Mylodontidae. On the basis of the remains, it can be concluded that it is a rather small member of the Mylodontidae. The construction of the limbs supports ground-dwelling locomotion, but this does not exclude occasional digging or climbing. The type and only known species is Simomylodon uccasamamensis.

== Discovery and naming ==
The scientific first description of Simomylodon was made in 2010 by Pierre-Antoine Saint-André and fellow researchers. As a basis served the finding material of the sites Ayo Ayo and Viscachani in the Bolivian department of La Paz, additionally also that from Pomata-Ayte in the Oruro Department, whereby Viscachani is considered as type locality. The holotype (specimen number GB 078) consists of an anterior partial skull lacking teeth. The genus name Simomylodon derives on the one hand from the Greek σίμός for "blunt-nosed" and refers to the partly blunt expression of the median jawbone, on the other hand it refers to the genus Mylodon, which, according to the opinion of the first authors at that time, could be derived from Simomylodon. The only species named by Saint-André and colleagues was Simomylodon uccasamamensis. The species epithet has its origin in Sanskrit (ucca for high and samam for plain or vastness) and is a reference to the region of discovery in the Altiplano (Spanish for "plateau"). The species name uccasamensis had already been mentioned by Saint-André in 1994 in a modified form (uccasamamense) in his unpublished graduate thesis in connection with "Simotherium".

In the same paper that contained the initial description of Simomylodon, Saint-André and his research team established the new species P. dalenzae placed in the genus Pleurolestodon on the basis of a complete skull from Choquecota in the Bolivian department of Oruro. Like uccasamamense, Saint-André had already used the species name dalenzae in his 1994 doctoral dissertation, but linked it to Glossotheriscum. Due to numerous new finds that did not reveal any differences with Simomylodon, Pleurolestodon dalenzae was synonymized with Simomylodon uccasamamensis in 2019 by a team of scientists led by Alberto Boscaini. The latter species is consequently the only recognized one within the genus Simomylodon so far. Other fossil material, such as single mandibles from Inchasi in the department of Oruro, was previously referred to other genera of mylodonts, such as Glossotheridium.

== Description ==
=== Skull and dentition features ===
Simomylodon was a rather small representative of the Mylodontidae, whose body weight was estimated to be around 228kg or 370kg, depending on the measurement methodology. Finds of the genus include several skulls and additional postcranial skeletal elements. The skull was elongate, with the skullcap and skull base nearly parallel in lateral view, but the anterior section was slightly lower than the posterior. In plan view, the posterior section of the skull was strikingly broad compared to the overall length. This is reminiscent of Pleurolestodon, but differs from other mylodonts such as Glossotherium and Paramylodon. The rostrum was short. The nasal bone showed a sharp constriction just in front of the eye windows and progressively widened both anteriorly and posteriorly. The anterior margin was largely convex. The forward widening snout in plan view is a typical characteristic of mylodonts. In lateral view, the snout was dominated by the maxilla, which fused with the nasal bone along nearly its entire length. The midjaw bone possessed a V-shaped to more curved appearance. forehead and parietal bone were flat. Slight temporal ridges rose on the parietal bones, which ran parallel but did not unite to form a parietal crest. The zygomatic arch was not closed. The anterior arch segment, attached to the zygomatic bone, consisted of three processes, one ascending, one horizontal, and one descending, as is common in sloths. The largest was the ascending process, which began broadly at the base and ended in a rounded tip. The horizontal process had a triangular shape and met with the long-narrow posterior arcuate portion of the temporal bone. The extremely long shape of the posterior zygomatic arch segment can be taken as an atypical feature of mylodonts. The descending process ended partially hook-shaped. The lacrimal bone was broad and formed part of the orbital rim, with the section involved in the ocular window exceeding that of the face. The occipital bone was vertical to sloping backward. The occipital bulge was strongly developed throughout. The joints for articulation with the cervical spine were prominent and clearly separated. At the base of the skull, the wing bones showed marked inflation. The palatine roof widened anteriorly analogous to the rostrum, thus possessing a V-shaped configuration. The lower jaw was about 24 cm long and about 5.5 cm high below the molar-like teeth. Thus it appeared short and stocky. At the lower edge the horizontal bone body was almost straight, a characteristic of the mylodonts. Anteriorly, the symphysis extended into a process typical of faunal bones, which in Simomylodon was short and broad and terminated in a straight edge, comparable to Glossotherium and Lestodon but divergent from Paramylodon. In lateral profile, the lower edge of the symphysis was irregular due to various depressions and indentations. The variable formation of the foramina mentalia with one to six openings is remarkable, although size and number varied greatly even in single individuals. The foramen mandibulae opened on the inner side of the mandible clearly behind the last tooth and below the crown process. On the ascending branch, all three processes (crown, articular, and angular) occurred distinctly separated from each other. The anterior margin of the ascending branch did not cover the last molar-like tooth. This is consistent with Paramylodon, but differs from Pleurolestodon and Mylodon. The crown process rose steeply and had a hooked end. The articular process sat at about the level of the masticatory plane of the teeth, and the joint itself was wider than long. The angular process at the posteriormost end of the mandible stood out clearly from the horizontal body of the bone by its bulging lower edge

The dentition of Simomylodon showed the typical structure of sloths. The respective upper row of teeth consisted of five, the lower of four teeth, thus a total of 18 teeth were formed. All teeth were in line except for the anterior tooth of the lower jaw, which was slightly displaced laterally to the outside. In the upper dentition the rows diverged from each other, in the lower they were more parallel. In both the upper and lower dentition, the foremost tooth in each case had a caniniform shape, all other teeth were molariform. This unites Simomylodon with most mylodonts except for instance Mylodon, whose foremost tooth in the upper dentition was reduced. A diastema between the caniniform and the molariform teeth was not developed, which is a difference to Lestodon with its extraordinarily large tooth gap. The anterior, canine tooth had a semicircular to triangular cross-section. It was relatively small, roughly consistent with Glossotherium and Pleurolestodon, but clearly different from Lestodon with its greatly enlarged anterior teeth. The molar-like teeth had the flat occlusal surface characteristic of mylodonts formed from two lobate (bilobate) structures that appeared diamond- or T-shaped in outline. Only the anterior upper molar-like tooth was oval in cross-section. The upper row of teeth was between 9.0 and 10.4 cm long, of which the molariform teeth occupied between 7.5 and 8.6 cm. The largest tooth was the rearmost in each case.

=== Skeletal characteristics ===
From the body skeleton of Simomylodon mainly the elements of the forelimbs and hindlimbs have been preserved. The in plan view triangular shoulder blade was largely similar to that of other mylodonts and possessed a massive shoulder bone. This extended ventrally and merged with the acromion or shoulder level, which in turn joined with the coracoid process. This created a characteristic arch called the "acromiocoracoid arch," a striking characteristic of sloths. The humerus measured 20.8 to 25.8 cm in length and had a hemispherical condyle to which the small protuberance (tuberculum minus) was directly attached. The large protuberance (tuberculum majus) merged into a pronounced deltopectoral groin on the shaft side, which functioned as a muscle attachment site. It was more prominent than in Glossotherium or Lestodon. The lower end of the joint protruded characteristically, but the external epicondyle was less conspicuously developed than in Glossotherium. The radius reached a length of 18.9 to 20.1 cm and appeared comparatively shorter and more compact than in Paramylodon, for example. The ulna has been preserved only fragmentarily, lacking the significant upper articular process, the olecranon. However, it was comparatively short in shape. The femur was 30.7 to 34.3 cm long. It was board-like flat, as in most ground sloths. Its shaft curved slightly sideways. There was a roughened area on the outer longitudinal edge that indicated the third rolling mound and was more developed than in Glossotherium. The greater trochanter was broad and deep, but not very raised, and thus lay below the condyle. This in turn sat on a short neck. At only 15.4 to 18.8 cm long, the tibia was barely half the length of the femur. This is typical for mylodonts and a clear contrast to, for example, the Megatheriidae with their strikingly longer lower leg sections. The joint ends appeared robust and broad in Simomylodon, the upper exceeding the lower in width, which is typical of ground-dwelling sloths. In addition to the slender fibula, a cyamella was also developed, a sesamoid bone of globular shape. Hands and feet survived with single root bones, metapodials, and phalanges. Reconstructed, the hand consisted of five rays, but only the first three fingers were claw-reinforced, which can be recognized by the corresponding pointed end-limbs. This configuration also commonly occurs in later mylodonts. The metacarpal bones were slender and elongate in construction. The third metacarpal reached up to 7.2 cm in length and in some cases was fused to the capitate bone. The second and first metacarpal bones were 5.5 and 3.8 cm long, respectively. The longest was the fourth with about 8 cm, while the outer one had the dimensions of the third. Only a few metatarsals are documented from the foot, except for the talus and calcaneus and other root bones, which also appeared relatively slender and graceful.

=== Osteoderms ===
Mylodonts were the only group of sloths to possess bony skin deposits, or the so-called osteoderms, which today are only found in armadillos. This is known especially from Mylodon, Glossotherium and Paramylodon. For Simomylodon also single bone platelets have been preserved, which belong to the earliest evidence within the mylodonts. A larger concretion found together with a skull consists of several osteoderms about 4 mm long. A piece recovered in isolation again measured about 17 mm in diameter. The wide variation in dimensions is remarkable. A position close to the head or neck is presumed for the compact assemblage.

== Distribution ==
Most of the fossil remains of Simomylodon were recovered in the central part of the Altiplano in southwestern Bolivia. The remains are distributed among several find points. The currently oldest is a skull from Choquecota in the Oruro Department about 3.5km southwest of the eponymous locality. It was deposited in the upper part of the largely Miocene Rosa Pata Formation in a depositional sequence of reddish sandstones about 15m below a prominent tuff band. This in turn is referred to as Toba 76 and is common as a marker horizon in the central Altiplano. Radiometric datings give the tuff an age of about 5.3 million years, placing it in the transition from the Upper Miocene to the Lower Pliocene. All other finds are younger and come stratigraphic from the area above the Toba 76 tuff. They were uncovered predominantly in the Umala Formation. The rock unit consists of sandy to clay Deposits. The most important fossil site is the Ayo Ayo and Viscachani discovery area about 70km south of La Paz in the La Paz Department. Here, in turn, another tuff, the Ayo Ayo Tuff, completes the Sedimentary Sequence. With an age of about 2.8 million years, it corresponds to the Upper Pliocene. Ayo Ayo and Viscachani are currently the northernmost sites in the Altiplano, they also represent the fossils of Simomylodon. Besides a partial skull, various skull and mandible fragments as well as parts of the body skeleton were found here. In total there are more than 90 objects found. Further fossil material in the form of several, sometimes complete skulls came to light in Pomata-Ayte, also Departamento Oruro, as well as in Inchasi and Casira in Departamento Potosí. The latter site is the southernmost of the Altiplano. The fossil remains here, including a palatine bone, a lower jaw fragment, and the posterior skull of a juvenile, were deposited in the Tafna Formation. Its exact stratigraphic position is poorly understood, but it probably also formed during the transition from Miocene to Pliocene.

In addition to the find province in the Altiplano, a lower jaw fragment from Arenas Blancas at the lower reaches of the Arroyo Chasicó about 10 kilometers (6.2 miles) north of Laguna Chasicó in the south of the Argentina's Buenos Aires Province can also be assigned to Simomylodon. The specimen, about 11cm long, which was found in the Arroyo Chasicó Formation, which dates to the Upper Miocene.

== Paleobiology ==
=== Sexual dimorphism and morphofunctional differences ===
Two types can be distinguished in Simomylodon with respect to skull and mandible morphology: a robust and a graceful form. The robust skulls are characterized by a wider rostrum compared to the total length. In detail, they also possess a more curved midjaw and a short and wide palate. The gracile skulls, on the other hand, have more distinctly V-shaped midjaw bones and long-narrow palates. Further variations are found in the posterior skull with a largely vertical occipital bone in the stout types and an oblique posterior one in the slender types. In the latter, this makes the occipital joints more prominent than in the former, whose condyles here lean more against the skull. At the mandible, robust forms have a clearly deeper horizontal bone body than in comparison the gracile ones. Similar differences can additionally be observed at the postcranial skeleton. As a rule, such striking morphological differences can be regarded as expressions of sexual dimorphism, with the more robust types in mammals being associated with males and the more slender ones with females.

It is also possible that the two morphotypes resulted in different behaviors. For extinct sloths, snout width is an important indicator with regard to feeding. Thus, forms with broad snouts can be classified as more grass-eating, while those with pointed snouts were probably specialized in soft leafy or mixed plant foods. Males often have more energetically demanding lives and thus require high amounts of food; females prefer higher-quality food to provide for their offspring. In Simomylodon the more robust, broad-nosed skulls of males and the more graceful, narrow-nosed skulls of females may reflect such differences. Evidence for this also comes from the posterior portion of the skull. Due to the vertical position of the occiput, the male individuals held the skull rather low, indicating a grass-based diet. The oblique occiput of the females advocates a higher head posture and thus a more leafy diet. Differing food preferences may also indicate divergent space use. Grass specialists tend to have larger action areas with more extensive migratory movements than animals preferring soft plant foods. This is also quite possible for Simomylodon.

=== Locomotion ===
The postcranial skeleton of Simomylodon is the most well-of a Miocene mylodont to date. It shows numerous similarities with later representatives of the group such as Glossotherium and Paramylodon. Compared to these giant forms, however, it lacks some special adaptations, largely due to its lighter body weight. The proportions of the limbs support ground-dwelling locomotion without certain specializations. Similar to later representatives of the mylodonts, the body's center of gravity was very far back, so that the main propelling force during walking came from the hind legs. The design of the femurs with a low and little forward protruding greater trochanter refers to a comparatively large freedom of movement of the hind leg. At the same time, this meant that the gluteal muscles (Musculus gluteus) were strongly developed. These in turn provided great leverage when bending the leg during locomotion, but at the same time this led to a reduction in strength during leg extension. The lower joint end of the femur is broad, and the joint rolls are wider laterally than deep longitudinally. This is an indicator of sole walkers in contemporary animals, where the knee joint is more deflected. As in other mylodonts, the lower sections of the hind legs are distinguished by their prominent shortening relative to the upper ones, recognizable by the tibia being only about half the length of the femur. Short lower limb sections are usually indicative of slow locomotion.

However, the generally powerful musculature indicated by the well-developed joints, in addition to locomotion on the ground, do not rule out the possibility that Simomylodon occasionally climbed tree trunks, similar to what is known for some bears, or used rocky terrain. However, the presumed body weight is too high to support a specific arboreal lifestyle. Also a partly burrowing activity cannot be excluded as it is also discussed for Glossotherium. The body center of gravity shifted far to the back with the hind legs as main drive for locomotion enabled the front legs to take over further functions.

== Classification ==
Simomylodon is an extinct genus from the also extinct family of Mylodontidae. The Mylodontidae form a branch within the suborder of sloths (Folivora). They are often referred to the superfamily Mylodontoidea together with the Orophodontidae and the Scelidotheriidae (however, the Scelidotheriidae and the Orophodontidae are also sometimes considered just a subfamily of the Mylodontidae). In a classical view, based on skeletal anatomical characters, the Mylodontoidea represent one of the two major evolutionary lineages of sloths, along with the Megatherioidea. According to molecular genetic analyses and protein studies, a third major lineage, the Megalocnoidea, can additionally be distinguished. According to the latter two analytical methods, the Mylodontoidea also include one of the two extant sloth genera today, the two-toed sloths of the genus Choloepus. The Mylodontidae are one of the most diverse groups within the sloths. Characteristic features that can be singled out are the high-crowned teeth with their, deviating from those of the Megatherioidea and the Megalocnoidea, rather flat (lobate) occlusal surfaces. This particular tooth structure is often associated with a greater adaptation to grassy foods. The posterior teeth have a round, oval, or more complex cross-section and correspond to molar-like teeth, while the anteriormost ones are each angular in shape. The hind foot is also distinctly rotated so that the sole points inward. Mylodonts can be traced as early as the Oligocene, with Paroctodontotherium from Salla-Luribay in Bolivia among the earliest forms.

The internal division of the Mylodontidae is complex and currently under discussion. Among the broadly recognized groups are the late evolutionary lineages of the Mylodontinae, with Mylodon as the type genus, and the Lestodontinae, whose type genus is Lestodon (the tribes Mylodontini and Lestodontini). Paramylodon and Glossotherium are also sometimes placed in the latter group. The subdivision of the terminal group of the mylodonts into the Lestodontinae and Mylodontinae received confirmation in one of the most comprehensive studies to date on the phylogeny of the sloths in 2004, based on cranial features, subsequently found multiple support. However, a later analysis from 2019 again doubts the integrity of the two lineages. In contrast, a higher-resolution paper on the phylogeny of mylodonts presented in the same year supports the branching of terminal representatives. As a significant difference between the Mylodontinae and Lestodontinae, the expression of the canine anterior teeth can be invoked, as these are large and separated from the posterior teeth by a long diastema in the latter, but reach only small dimensions or are partially reduced and more closely opposed to the molar-like teeth in the former. Numerous other subfamilies have been established in the past, such as the Nematheriinae for representatives from the Lower Miocene or the Octomylodontinae for all basal forms. Depending on the author, however, their respective recognition varies. Another group is found with the Urumacotheriinae, which was named back in 2004. In general, most researchers urge a revision for the entire family, since numerous of the higher taxonomic units do not have a formal diagnosis. Simomylodon is usually considered closely related to Pleurolestodon, which in turn is considered by numerous studies to have shown closer relationships to Glossotherium and Paramylodon. In addition, Simomylodon is also relegated to a more basal position within the Mylodontinae.

Below is a phylogenetic tree of the Mylodontinae, based on the work of Boscaini and colleagues (2019).

- Mylodontidae
  - - Urumacotherium
    - Pseudoprepotherium
  - - - Paroctodontotherium
      - Octodontotherium
    - Mylodontinae
      - Brievabradys
      - - Lestodontini
          - - Lestodon
            - Bolivartherium
          - - Thinobadistes
            - - Sphenotherus
              - Lestobradys
        - Mylodontini
          - Pleurolestodon
          - - - Glossotheridium
              - Simomylodon
            - - - - Kiyumylodon
                  - Mylodon
                - Paramylodon
              - Glossotherium
