= Lestobradys =

Lestobradys Temporal range: Late Miocene (Mayoan-Montehermosan) ~11.6–5.4 Ma

Scientific classification
- Kingdom: Animalia
- Phylum: Chordata
- Class: Mammalia
- Order: Pilosa
- Family: †Mylodontidae
- Genus: †Lestobradys; Rinderknecht et al. 2010
- Species: †L. sprechmanni

Binomial name
- †Lestobradys sprechmanni Rinderknecht et al. 2010

Extinct genus of ground sloths

Lestobradys is an extinct genus of ground sloth (family Mylodontidae), which existed in Uruguay during the Late Miocene period; Huayquerian in the South American land mammal age (SALMA). The type species is L. sprechmanni, found in the Camacho Formation of Uruguay.

== Etymology ==
The genus name, Lestobradys, is derived from lesto, meaning "robber", which refers to the genus' morphological similarities to the Plio-Pleistocene Lestodon, while "bradys" means "slow" due to its common use in ground sloths. The specific name is after Uruguayan paleontologist and professor Peter Sprechmann.

== History and taxonomy ==
Lestobradys was first described in 2010 based on a fragmentary skull, nearly complete hemimandible, 2 complete dorsal vertebrae, another fragmentary dorsal, and 2 complete caudal vertebrae that were made the holotype and registered at the Coleccion de Paleontologia de Vertebrados de la Facultad de Ciencias under FCDPV 1826. A nearly complete mandible, FCDPV 462, was also referred as a paratype that was originally referred to Ranculcus. The holotype had been collected in Kiyu beach coastal platform, 1 kilometer east of San Gregorio creek in San Jose, Uruguay. The strata the holotype fossils were found in was from the San Pedro member of the Camacho Formation of the Huayquerian, late Miocene. Additionally, an astragalaus was also referred to Lestobradys sprechmanni that may be part of the holotype individual that had been found nearby.

== Description ==
Due to the fragmentary nature of the fossils of Lestobradys, much of the anatomy has to be inferred based on more complete relatives like Thinobadistes and Lestodon. According to Rinderknecht et al (2010), Lestobradys was diagnosed under the autapomorphies; a combination of a first alveolus strongly projected toward the labial region that is separated from the rest of the alveoli of the dental series by a marked diastema, a subtriangular second alveolus, a subquadrangular third alveolus, and a bilobed last alveolus with a clearly defined isthmus separating both lobes. The caudal vertebrae of the type bear completely fused vertebral discs in the centra meaning that the individual was an adult or subadult at the time of its death. The astragalus' internal articular surface for the tibia forms a distinct elevated odontoid process, as a result of which the tibial surfaces of the astragalus overlap each other, forming a slightly acute angle. This condition is also seen in Lestodon, some mylodontids, and some megatheriids.

== Classification ==
Lestobradys was classified as a basal mylodontine by Rinderknecht et al on the basis of the dental anatomy in the labial portion of the mandible, noting that the morphology of the mandibles of Lestobradys is similar to that of Lestodon in bearing a prominent labial projection of the first tooth (caniniform) separated by a long diastema. However, the teeth of Lestodon are all rounded while the 2nd and 3rd teeth are prismatic in Lestobradys. The long diastema is also similar to that in Ocnotherium but is much more pronounced and the taxa bearing this differentiates it from Pseudoprepotherium.

In their phylogenetic analysis of Mylodontoidea, Boscaini et al (2019) recovered Lestobradys as the sister taxon to Sphenotherus zavaletianus and as a lestodontin instead of a basal mylodontid.

- Mylodontinae
  - Lestodontini
    - - Lestodon
      - Bolivartherium
    - - Thinobadistes
      - - Lestobradys
        - Sphenotherus
  - Mylodontini
    - Pleurolestodon
    - - - Glossotheridium
        - Simomylodon
      - - Glossotherium
        - - Paramylodon
          - - Mylodon
            - Kiyumylodon
