= Urumacotherium =

Urumacotherium Temporal range: Middle Miocene-Early Pliocene (Laventan-Montehermosan) ~13.8–5.3 Ma

Scientific classification
- Kingdom: Animalia
- Phylum: Chordata
- Class: Mammalia
- Order: Pilosa
- Family: †Mylodontidae
- Genus: †Urumacotherium; Bocquentin-Villanueva, 1983

Type species
- †Urumacotherium garciai Bocquentin-Villanueva, 1983

Other species
- †U. campbelli Frailey 1986

Extinct genus of ground sloths

Urumacotherium (meaning "Urumaco beast") is an extinct genus of ground sloths of the family Mylodontidae. It lived from the Middle Miocene to the Early Pliocene of what is now Brazil, Peru and Venezuela.

== Classification ==
Urumacotherium is an extinct genus of the also extinct family Mylodontidae. The Mylodontidae represent a branch of the suborder of sloths (Folivora). Within this they are often grouped together with the Orophodontidae and the Scelidotheriidae in the superfamily Mylodontoidea (sometimes, however, the Scelidotheriidae and the Orophodontidae are considered only as a subfamily of the Mylodontidae). In a classical view, based on skeletal anatomical studies, the Mylodontoidea in turn represent one of the two major evolutionary lineages of sloths, along with the Megatherioidea. Molecular genetic studies and protein analyses assign a third to these two groups, the Megalocnoidea. Within the Mylodontoidea are the two-fingered sloths of the genus Choloepus, one of the two extant sloth genera. The Mylodontidae form one of the most diverse groups within the sloths. Prominent features are found in their high-crowned teeth, which deviate from those of the Megatherioidea with a rather flat (lobate) occlusal surface. This is often associated with a greater adaptation to grassy foods. The posterior teeth have a round or oval cross-section, while the anteriormost have a canine-like design. The hind foot is also distinctly rotated so that the sole points inward. Mylodonts appeared as early as the Oligocene, with Paroctodontotherium from Salla-Luribay in Bolivia among their earliest records.

The internal division of the Mylodontidae is complex and much debated. Widely accepted are the late groups of the Mylodontinae with Mylodon as the type genus and the Lestodontinae, whose type genus is Lestodon but sometimes includes Paramylodon and Glossotherium (sometimes also listed as belonging to the tribes Mylodontini and Lestodontini). The subdivision of the terminal group of mylodonts into the Lestodontinae and Mylodontinae found confirmation in one of the most comprehensive studies of the phylogeny of sloths based on cranial features in 2004, which subsequently found multiple support. However, a later analysis from 2019 doubts it again. A higher-resolution phylogenetic study of the mylodonts published in the same year again supports the branching of terminal forms. According to this, the Mylodontinae and Lestodontinae can be distinguished on the basis of the canine anterior teeth. In the latter, these are large and separated from the posterior teeth by a long diastema; the former, on the other hand, have only small or partially reduced caniniform teeth, which are usually more closely apposed to the molar-like teeth. Numerous other subfamilies have been established in the past, including, for example, the Nematheriinae for representatives from the Lower Miocene or the Octomylodontinae for all basal forms. Their recognition varies mostly depending on the editor. Another group is found with the Urumacotheriinae, of which is named after Urumacotherium which were established only in 2004. Their basic population is formed by the late Miocene representatives of northern South America. In principle, a revision is urged for the entire family, since numerous of the higher taxonomic units do not have a formal diagnosis.

Below is a phylogenetic tree of the Mylodontidae, based on the work of Boscaini and colleagues (2019).

- Mylodontidae
  - - Urumacotherium
    - Pseudoprepotherium
  - - - Paroctodontotherium
      - Octodontotherium
    - Mylodontinae
      - Brievabradys
      - - Lestodontini
          - - Lestodon
            - Bolivartherium
          - - Thinobadistes
            - - Sphenotherus
              - Lestobradys
        - Mylodontini
          - Pleurolestodon
          - - - Glossotheridium
              - Simomylodon
            - - - - Kiyumylodon
                  - Mylodon
                - Paramylodon
              - Glossotherium

== Palaeoecology ==
U. campbelli was a specialist folivore and frugivore, as evidenced by its narrow muzzle and its polished tooth surfaces with few coarse scars.
