= Urumaco Formation =

Geologic formation in Venezuela

- Stratigraphic range: Late Miocene
- Type: Geological formation

Location
- Country: Venezuela

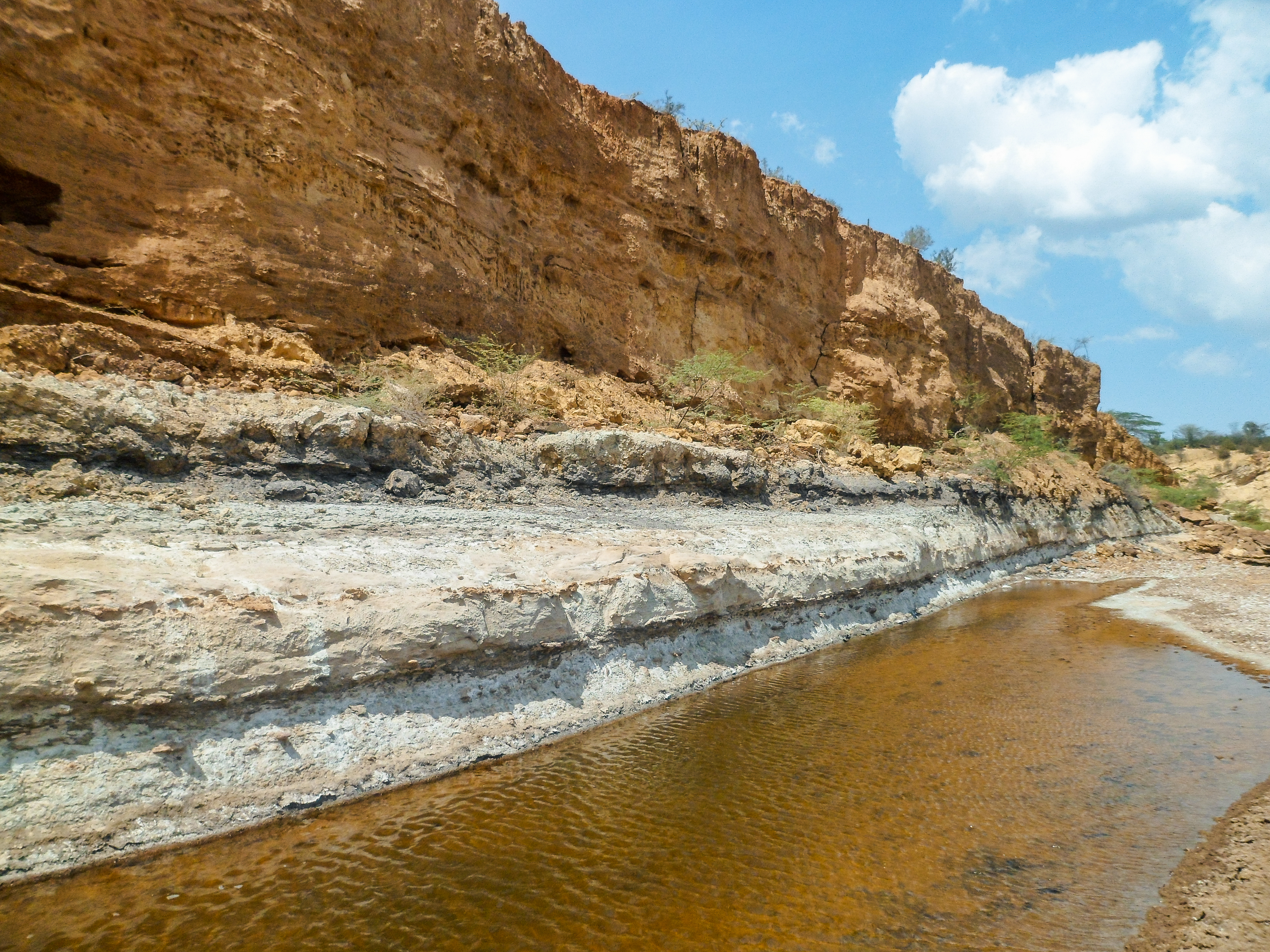
Urumaco Formations eroded by the sun, wind, and rain in the Urumaco Desert.

The Urumaco Formation is a formation in Venezuela that includes deposits from the Late Miocene. It is the site of several "giant forms": the turtles, crocodiles, sloths and rodents of Urumaco are among the largest of their groups.

== Location ==
The Urumaco formation is located in the Urumaco region in the Caribbean coastal Falcón state. The deposits date from 10 to 5.3 million years ago and the Urumaco formation was deposited in an area with large rivers, swamps, estuaries, lagoons and shallow coastal seas. These conditions in the Late Miocene contrast strongly with the current dry environment in the area today.

== Fauna ==
=== Cartilaginous fish ===
There are 21 known species of cartilaginous fishes from the Urumaco Formation, belonging to the orders Lamniformes, Carcharhiniformes, Myliobatiformes and Rajiformes. Carcharhinus caquetius is an endemic species of predator shark from Urumaco. A large number of well-preserved fossils of the sawfish Pristis rostra have been found in the deposits. The megalodon is also known from the Urumaco Formation. The coastal seas of Urumaco were further inhabited by species that still live in the Caribbean Sea today, such as the spotted eagle ray, smooth hammerhead shark, tiger shark and bull shark.

=== Bony fish ===
The bony fishes from the Urumaco Formation include groupers, piranha-like fish such as pacas, cuttlefish, thorny catfish and red-tailed catfish.

=== Reptiles ===
The Urumaco Formation has a great diversity of crocodilians with twelve known species. Seven species of caimans have been described: Caiman brevirostris, C. latirostris, Globidentosuchus brachyrostris, Melanosuchus fisheri, Mourasuchus arendsi, M. nativus and Purussaurus mirandai, Gryposuchus croizati, G. jessei, Hesperogavialis cruxenti and Ikanogavialis gameroi are the gavials of Urumaco, a group that is no longer found in South America today. The kinship of Charactosuchus mendesi with the other crocodilians is considered unclear. Multiple species of crocodilians were able to live together because they focused on specific niches, limiting infraspecific competition. For example, the 4.3–5.5 metres (14–18 ft) Mourasuchus arendsi had a duck-like beak with which it caught crustaceans, the fish-eating Gryposuchus croizati, 10 metres (33 ft) in length, lived particularly in estuaries, and Purussaurus mirandai, 10 metres (33 ft) in length, hunted a wide range of prey animals.

Stupendemys geographicus is the best-known turtle species from the Urumaco formation. This animal from the American necked turtles family was one of the largest turtles ever with a shell 2.4–3 metres (7.9–9.8 ft) long. Other turtles from Urumaco include several species of Bairdemys, the mata mata Chelus lewisi and softshell turtles.

In addition to the multiple crocodilians and turtles, vertebra of a boa have also been found in the Urumaco Formation.

=== Mammals ===
Phoberomys pattersoni is one of the largest known rodents ever. This three-meter-long relative of today's pacarana had a lifestyle similar to that of the capybara. Several species of xenarthrans are known from the Urumaco Formation. Urumaquia robusta was a ground sloth from the Megatheriidae weighing four tons. Others ground sloths from Urumaco are Bolivartherium urumaquensis, Urumacotherium garciai, Eionaletherium tanycnemius, and Pseudoprepotherium venezuelanum belonging to the Mylodontidae.Urumacocnus urbani and Pattersonocnus diazgameroi are ground sloths from the Megalonychidae. Boreostemma pliocena is a glyptodont. Bounodus enigmaticus (Proterotheriidae, Litopterna) and Gyrinodon (Toxodontidae, Notoungulata) are the South American ungulates of the Urumaco formation. In the waters of Urumaco lived the freshwater dolphins Ischyrorhynchus vanbenedeni and Saurodelphis and the dugongs Nanosiren sanchezi and possibly Metaxytherium.
