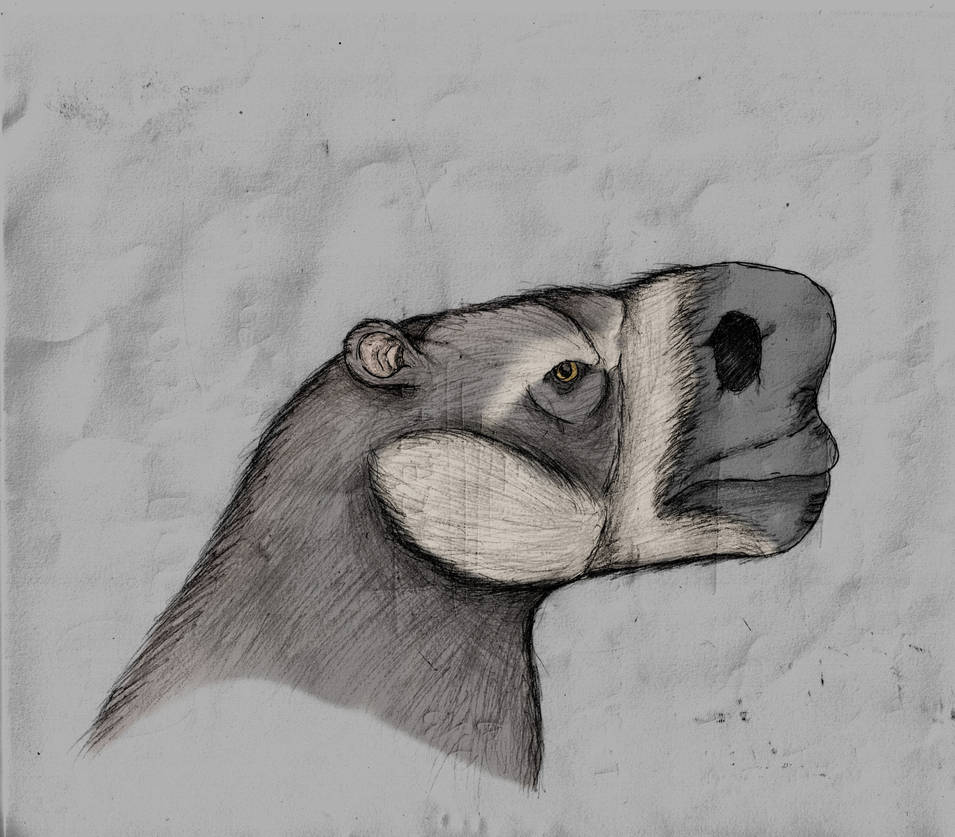
- Life restoration

Scientific classification
- Kingdom: Animalia
- Phylum: Chordata
- Class: Mammalia
- Infraclass: Placentalia
- Order: Pilosa
- Suborder: Folivora
- Family: †Mylodontidae
- Subfamily: †Mylodontinae
- Genus: †Mylodonopsis; Cartelle 1991

Type species
- Mylodonopsis ibseni Cartelle 1991

= Mylodonopsis =

Mylodonopsis Temporal range: Late Pleistocene

Extinct genus of ground sloth

Mylodonopsis is an extinct genus of ground sloth, containing a single species, Mylodonopsis ibseni from the Late Pleistocene of Brazil. It is a member of the family Mylodontidae. Although only known from fragmentary fossil remains, it has been proposed to be closely related to Mylodon.

== Palaeobiology ==
It is suggested to have been a mixed feeder, being capable of both browsing and grazing. Two M. ibseni haemal arches and a caudal vertebra recovered from Gruta dos Brejões show evidence of palaeopathologies in the form of eroded articular surfaces.
