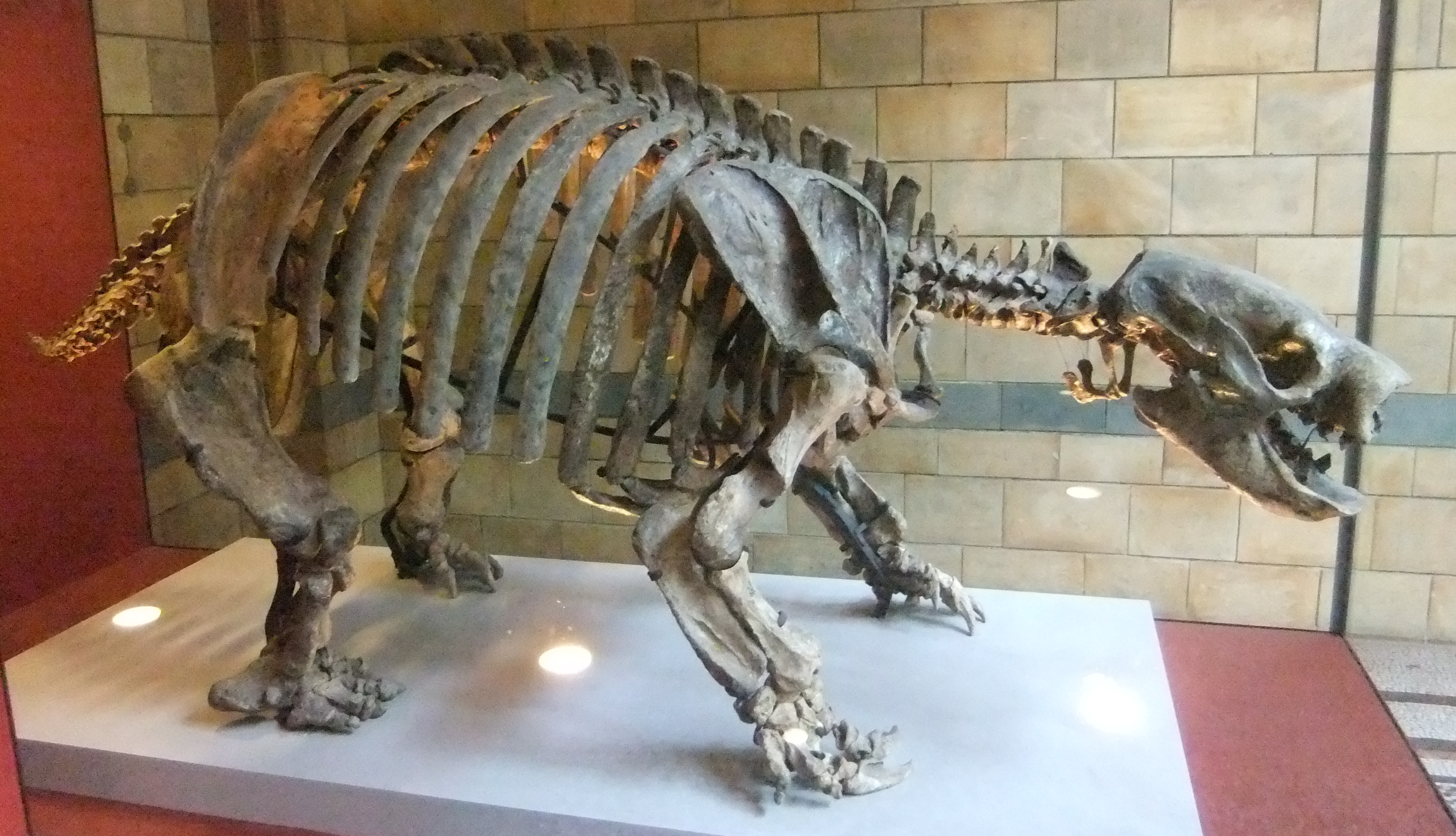
- Skeleton of Glossotherium robustum at the Natural History Museum, London

Scientific classification
- Kingdom: Animalia
- Phylum: Chordata
- Class: Mammalia
- Order: Pilosa
- Family: †Mylodontidae
- Subfamily: †Mylodontinae; Gill, 1872

Subgroups
- †Archaeomylodon; †Brievabradys?; †Glossotheriopsis; †Megabradys; †Mylodonopsis; †Ocnotherium; †Oreomylodon?; †Prolestodon; †Promylodon; †Ranculcus; †Strabosodon; †Lestodontini; †Bolivartherium; †Lestobradys; †Lestodon; †Magdalenabradys; †Sphenotherus; †Thinobadistes; †Mylodontini; †Glossotheridium; †Glossotherium; †Kiyumylodon; †Mylodon; †Paramylodon; †Pleurolestodon; †Simomylodon

= Mylodontinae =

Mylodontinae Temporal range: Middle Miocene to Early Holocene (Hemphillian-Rancholabrean (NALMA) & Colloncuran-Lujanian (SALMA) ~15.5–0.010 Ma

Extinct subfamily of mammals

Mylodontinae is an extinct subfamily of ground sloths that lived from the Early Miocene to the Early Holocene epochs.

== Classification ==
The classification of the Mylodontidae is complex and often under discussion. The most widely accepted subfamilies are the Mylodontinae with Mylodon as the type genus and the Lestodontinae, whose type genus is Lestodon, which sometimes also includes Paramylodon and Glossotherium (sometimes also listed as belonging to the tribes Mylodontini and Lestodontini. The subdivision of the terminal group of mylodonts into the Lestodontinae and Mylodontinae found confirmation in one of the most comprehensive studies of the phylogeny of sloths based on cranial features in 2004, which subsequently found multiple support. However, a later analysis from 2019 cast doubt on it again. A higher-resolution phylogenetic study of the mylodonts published in the same year again supports the branching of terminal forms. According to this, the Mylodontinae and Lestodontinae can be distinguished on the basis of the canine anterior teeth. In the latter, these are large and separated from the posterior teeth by a long diastema; the former, on the other hand, have only small or partially reduced caniniform teeth, which are usually more closely apposed to the molar-like teeth. Numerous other subfamilies have been established in the past, including, for example, the Nematheriinae for representatives from the Lower Miocene or the Octomylodontinae for all basal forms. Their recognition varies mostly depending on the author. Another subfamily, the Urumacotheriinae, were established only in 2004. Their basal position consists of the late Miocene representatives of northern South America. In principle, a revision for the entire family is urged, since many of the higher taxonomic units lack a formal diagnosis.

Below is a phylogenetic tree of the Mylodontinae, based on the work of Boscaini and colleagues (2019).

- Mylodontidae
  - - Pseudoprepotherium
    - Urumacotherium
  - - - Octodontotherium
      - Paroctodontotherium
    - - Brievabradys
      - Mylodontinae
        - Lestodontini
          - - Bolivartherium
            - Lestodon
          - - Thinobadistes
            - - Lestobradys
              - Sphenotherus
        - Mylodontini
          - Pleurolestodon
          - - - Glossotheridium
              - Simomylodon
            - - Glossotherium
              - - Paramylodon
                - - Kiyumylodon
                  - Mylodon
