= Ocnotherium =

Ocnotherium Temporal range: Late Pleistocene

Scientific classification
- Kingdom: Animalia
- Phylum: Chordata
- Class: Mammalia
- Order: Pilosa
- Family: †Mylodontidae
- Subfamily: †Mylodontinae
- Genus: †Ocnotherium; Lund, 1842

Type species
- Ocnotherium giganteum (Lund, 1839)

Extinct genus of ground sloth

Ocnotherium is an extinct genus of ground sloth known from the Late Pleistocene of Brazil, belonging to the family Mylodontidae, containing the species Ocnotherium giganteum. It is a member of the subfamily Mylodontinae, but its relationship to other members of that subfamily are uncertain. It had osteoderms embedded within its skin, like some other mylodontids.

== Palaeobiology ==
O. giganteum was likely a mixed feeder, and may have been adapted to digging.

=== Palaeopathology ===
A number of O. giganteum individuals are known to exhibit pathologies, including Schmorl's node in the vertebrae, osteochondritis dissecans in the phalanges, and osteoarthritis in the humerus. Many specimens also exhibit spondyloarthropathy and calcium pyrophosphate deposition disease.
