= Gyrolithes =

Trace fossil

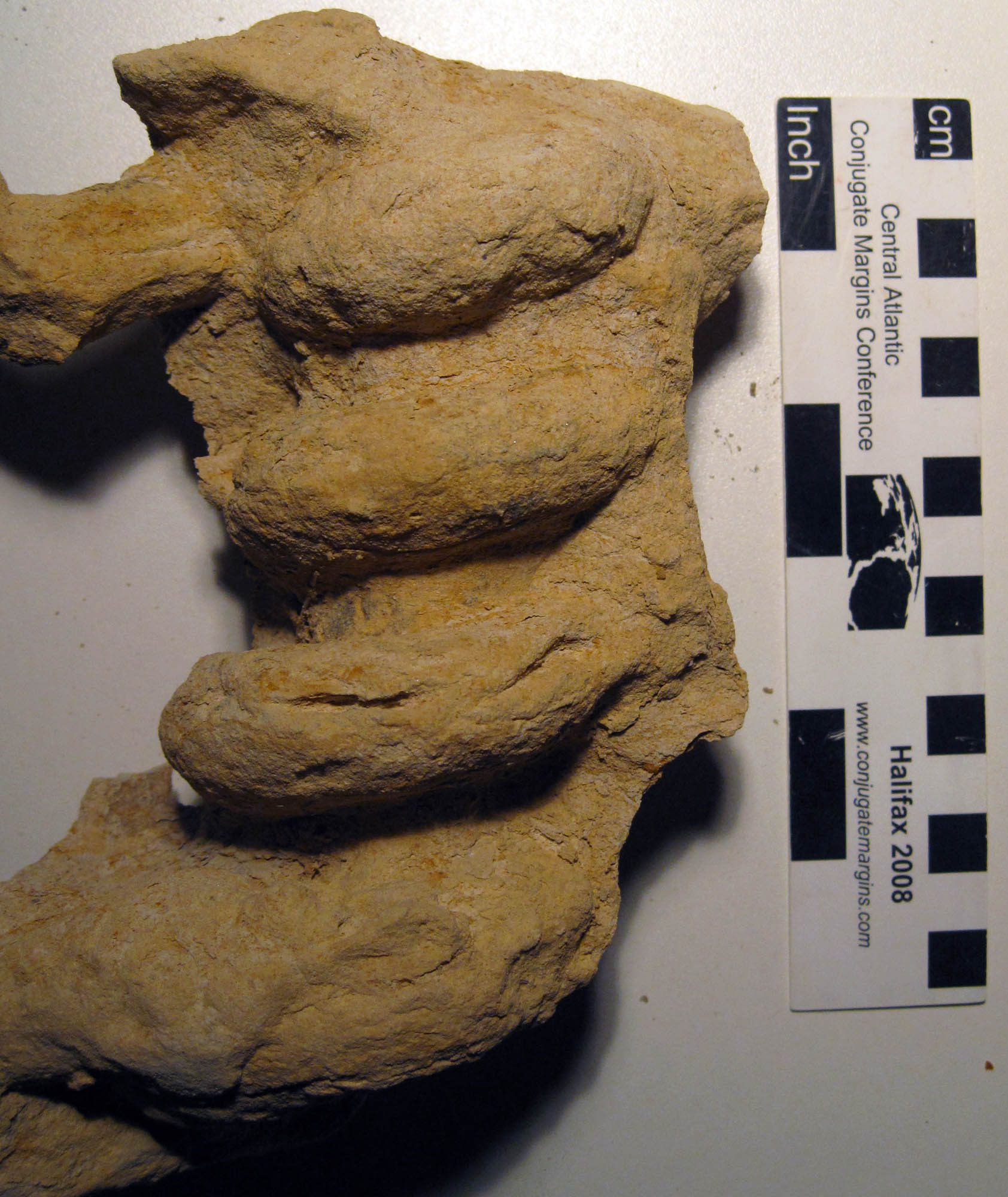
Gyrolithe from the Pliocene

Gyrolithes is a trace fossil consisting of a vertically spiraling burrow, known from Cambrian strata onward.
