= Pattersonocnus =

Pattersonocnus Temporal range: Late Miocene (Mayoan–Huayquerian) ~11.6–5.3 Ma

Scientific classification
- Domain: Eukaryota
- Kingdom: Animalia
- Phylum: Chordata
- Class: Mammalia
- Order: Pilosa
- Family: †Megalonychidae
- Genus: †Pattersonocnus; Rincón et al., 2019
- Species: †P. diazgameroi

Binomial name
- †Pattersonocnus diazgameroi Rincón et al., 2019

Extinct genus of ground sloths

Pattersonocnus is an extinct genus of megalonychid sloth that lived during the Miocene in Venezuela 11.6 million years ago. The genus contains one known species, Pattersonocnus diazgameroi. Fossils have been found in the Urumaco Formation of Venezuela.
