= Octomylodon =

Octomylodon Temporal range: Late Miocene (Huayquerian) ~9.0–6.8 Ma

Scientific classification
- Kingdom: Animalia
- Phylum: Chordata
- Class: Mammalia
- Order: Pilosa
- Family: †Mylodontidae
- Genus: †Octomylodon; Ameghino, 1904

Species
- O. aversus; robertoscagliai

Extinct genus of ground sloths

Octomylodon is an extinct genus of ground sloth of the family Mylodontidae, living during the Late Miocene (Huayquerian). Fossil remains of Octomylodon have been found uniquely in the Ituzaingó Formation, Argentina, South America from 9.0 to 6.8 mya, existing for approximately 2.2 million years.

== Taxonomy ==
Octomylodon was assigned to Mylodontidae by Carroll (1988).
