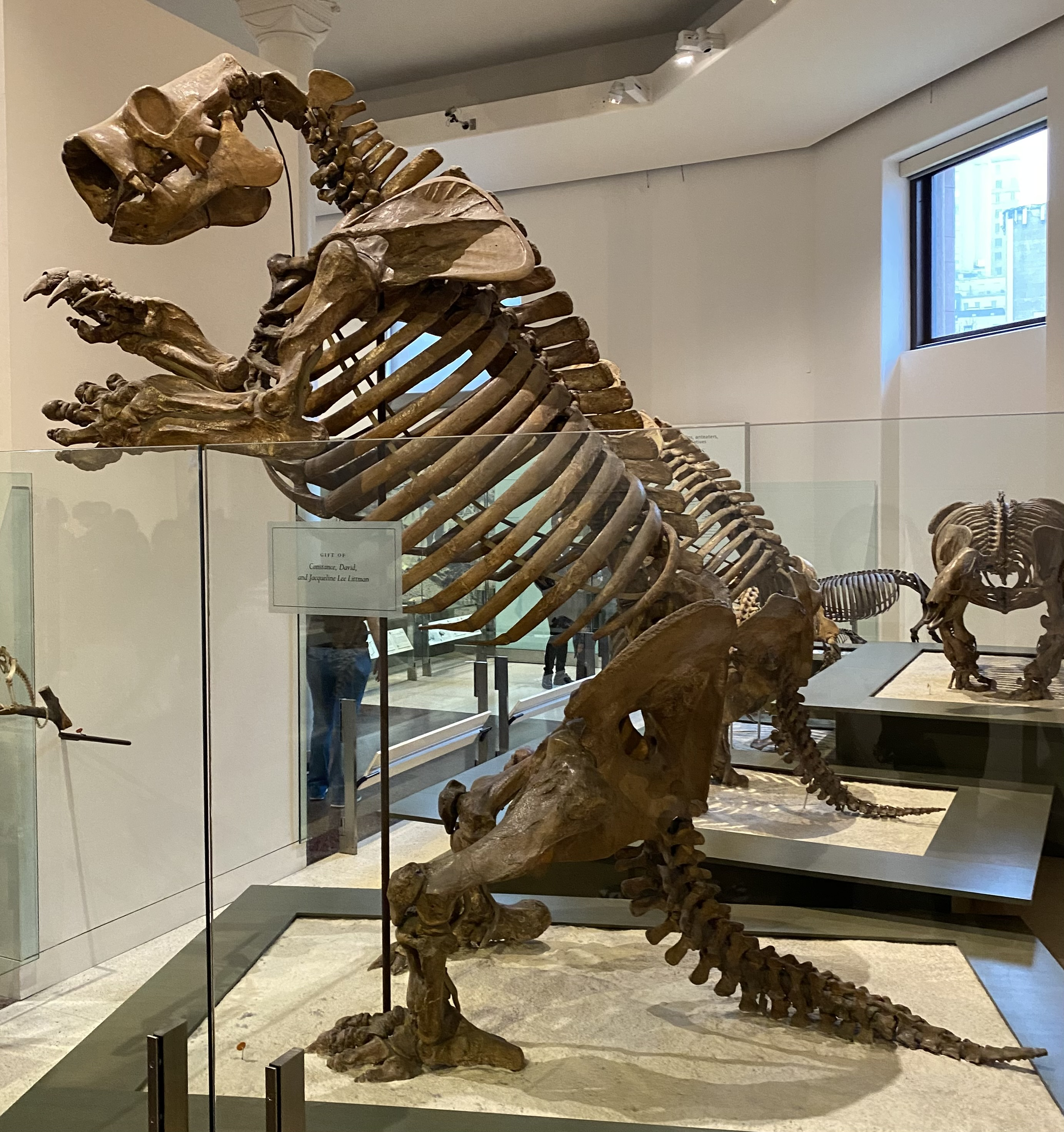
- L. armatus skeleton at the American Museum of Natural History

Scientific classification
- Kingdom: Animalia
- Phylum: Chordata
- Class: Mammalia
- Order: Pilosa
- Suborder: Folivora
- Family: †Mylodontidae
- Subfamily: †Mylodontinae
- Tribe: †Lestodontini
- Genus: †Lestodon; Gervais 1855

Species
- † L. armatus Gervais 1855, type

= Lestodon =

Lestodon Temporal range: ~5.332–0.10 Ma Early Pliocene - Early Holocene

Extinct genus of ground sloths

Lestodon is an extinct genus of giant ground sloth native to South America during the Pleistocene epoch. Its fossil remains have primarily been found in the Pampas and adjacent regions. The largest member of the family Mylodontidae, It is estimated to have weighed 4,100 kilograms (4.5 short tons). It was a herbivore and primarily fed on the grasses and low-growing plants.

== Research history and taxonomy ==
The genus Lestodon and the species Lestodon armatus was erected by Paul Gervais in 1855, based on a fragments of the upper and lower jaws with teeth found in Late Pleistocene deposits what is currently Buenos Aires Province, Argentina. The genus name, which means "thief tooth", is in reference to the large caniniform teeth at the front of the jaw. In 1934, a second species L. australis was erected by Lucas Kraglievich, but this is now regarded as a junior synonym of L. armatus. In 2004, two additional species L. urumaquensis and L. codorensis were described based on fossils found in Late Miocene/Early Pliocene aged deposits in Venezuela. However other authors have doubted the placement of these taxa in Lestodon, with later studies generally placing them in the separate genus Bolivartherium.

Lestodon is a member of the family Mylodontidae, meaning that its closest living relatives are two-toed sloths. Phylogeny of sloths based on DNA after Delsuc et al. 2019.

- Folivora (sloths)
  - †Caribbean sloths
  - - Mylodontoidea
      - Two-toed sloths (Choelopus)
      - †Mylodontidae (Mylodon)
    - Megatherioidea
      - †Megatheriidae (Megatherium)
      - - - †Megalonychidae (Megalonyx)
          - †Nothrotheriidae (Nothrotheriops)
        - Three-toed sloths (Bradypus)

Within Mylodontidae, Lestodon is considered to be a member of the subfamily Mylodontinae (when Scelidotheriidae is not considered a separate family). It is the titular genus of the tribe Lestodontini, which often aside from Lestodon, includes Thinobadistes, Lestobradys and Bolivartherium, though this grouping as a whole is not always recovered as monophyletic.

== Description ==
=== Size ===
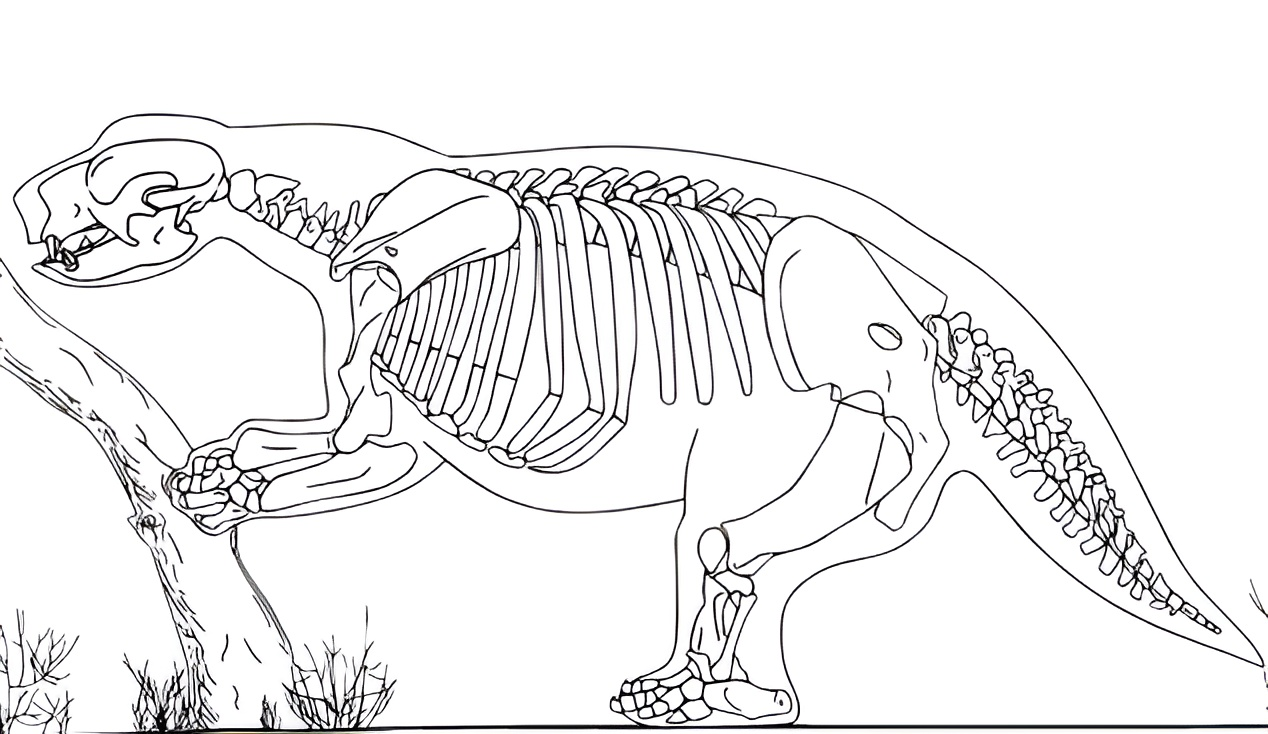
Skeletal diagram of Lestodon armatus in lateral view

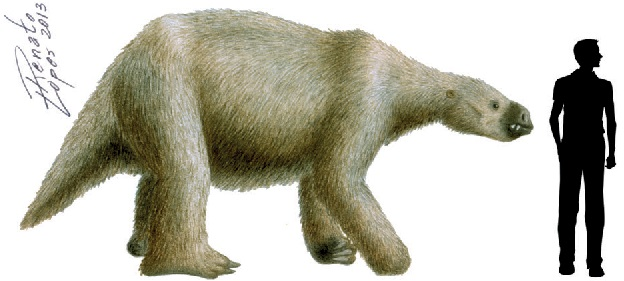
Size of Lestodon compared to a human

Lestodon armatus is the largest known mylodontid sloth, attaining a length of 15 feet (4.6 m). Volumetric estimates suggests a body mass of around 4,100 kilograms (9,000 lb), making it one of the largest known ground sloths, alongside the megatheres Megatherium and Eremotherium.

=== Skull ===
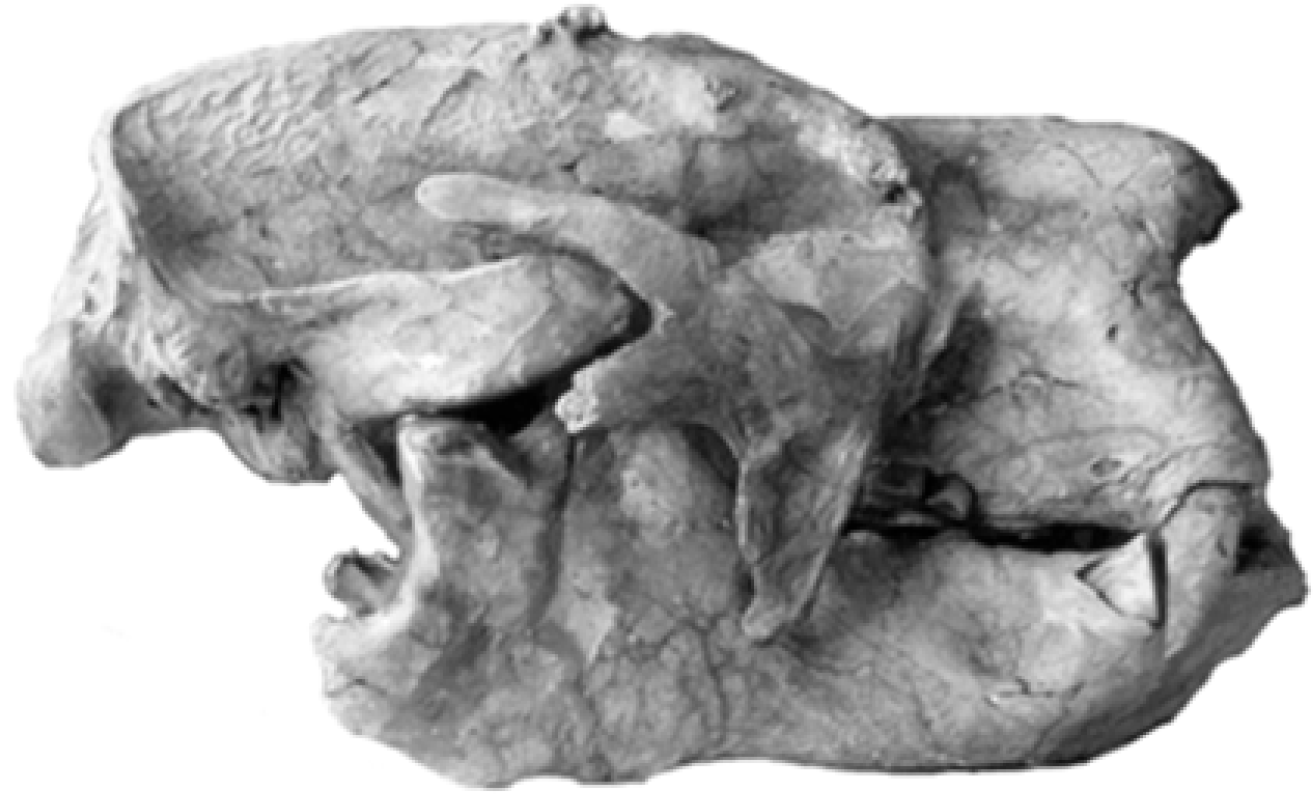
Skull in side-on view

The skull of Lestodon armatus has a very wide muzzle. The premaxilllae are weakly attached to the maxillae (often resulting in them being absent in recovered fossils). The nasal septum was thin and weak, and as a result is rarely preserved. The nasal cartilage was apparently not ossified. The roof of the muzzle is marginally concave along its midline. The maxilla extends more towards the front of the skull on its lower part. The nasofrontal suture is U-shaped, and opens forwards. The foramen magnum is oval-shaped. The teeth were quite hypsodont (high-crowned), though not to the same degree as achieved in some other mylodontids. At the front of the mouth there were two pairs of tusk-like "caniniform" teeth on the upper and lower jaws which are separated from the molariform teeth by a large diastema (gap). The lower caniniform teeth appear to exhibit sexual dimorphism in regard to size. The molariform teeth are largely similar to each other, aside from the last lower molar "which has two rounded lobes separated by a narrow constriction giving it a figure-8 shape". There are 5 and 4 teeth in each half of the upper and lower jaw respectively, as is typical of mylodontids.

=== Axial skeleton ===
The first thoracic vertebra has a much higher neural spine than the seventh cervical vertebra.

=== Limbs ===
The olecranon process of the ulna of Lestodom armatus is slightly short compared to body size, though large in absolute terms. The tibia and fibula of L. armatus are fused together at the end closest to the hip (proximal). The tibia is relatively short compared to body size. Like many other ground sloths, the foot is inwardly rotated, meaning that the weight was borne on the outer digits of the foot as well as on the calcaneus. Like other ground sloths, the hands had ungual phalanges indicating well-developed claws. Like many other ground sloths, the hind foot is inwardly rotated so that the body weight was borne on the fifth metatarsal and calcaneus. The first digit on the hindfoot has been lost, with the fifth and fourth digits additionally being reduced, while digits two and three retained claws. This condition is very similar to fellow mylodontids Paramylodon, Glossotherium and Thinobadistes, though in the form of talus it more closely resembles members of the family Megatheriidae.

== Distribution ==
Lestodon armatus is primarily known from the Pampas and the Chaco-Paraná Basin, including what is now southern Brazil, Paraguay, Uruguay, and northern Argentina. Remains correspond to between the Montehermosan and Lujanian faunal stages of South America.

== Ecology ==
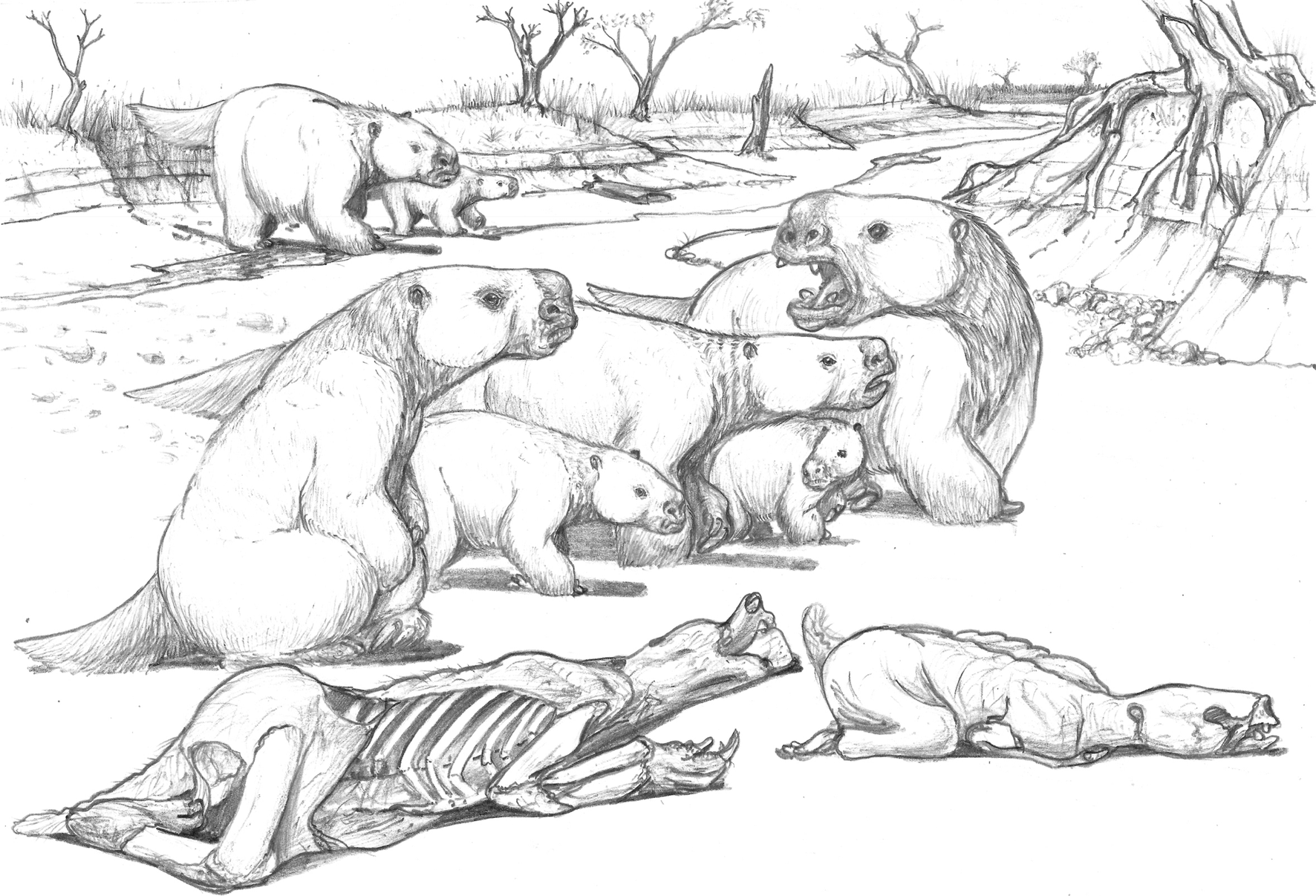
Life restoration of a group of Lestodon

Lestodon is generally regarded as having a grazing diet. Lestodon is thought to have been a bulk feeder that indiscriminately consumed large amounts of vegetation, using its probably square, white rhinoceros-like lips to pluck grass and other low lying plants in combination with the tongue. Isotopic analysis has suggested that Lestodon consumed a varying proportion of C_{3} and C_{4} plants, depending on locality. The dental mesowear of Lestodon armatus is indicative of its highly abrasive diet and supports the inference that it was a grazer and that it may have fed on roots. Although the proportions of its forelimbs are similar to those of mylodontids like Glossotherium that are suggested to have engaged in digging, the strength of its forelimb is much lower than those mylodontids, indicating that they were not substantially adapted to this task. If Lestodon engaged in digging at all, it may have engaged in it only in short intervals. Lestodon, like other ground sloths, was likely incapable of running from predators, instead relying on its claws to defend itself as living sloths do.

A bonebed of 13 Lestodon armatus individuals of different ages found together at the Playa del Barco site in Argentina suggests that the species engaged in gregarious behaviour, living at least some of the time in social groups. Analysis of the stapes of L. armatus suggests that they were adapted to hearing-low frequency sounds, suggesting that they may have communicated with each other using low frequency sound, like living elephants. It has been suggested based on the likely sexual dimorphism of the lower tusk-like caniniforms, that Lestodon armatus had a polygynous mating system, with males possibly engaging in combat with each other over females.

== Relationship with humans and extinction ==
Researchers working at the Arroyo del Vizcaíno site near Sauce, Uruguay suggested that Lestodon was hunted by humans about 30,000 years ago. This was based on analysis of Lestodon bones. Deep slash markings on some of them were suggested to be from the use of human stone tools. However, there are no unambiguous stone tools at the site, and the supposed "cut marks" could easily have been generated by non-human activities, such as trampling. The site is also considerably older than the earliest widely accepted dates for human presence in South America (which dates to around 16–14,500 years ago).

Lestodon became extinct at the end of the Late Pleistocene as part of the Late Pleistocene megafauna extinctions, along with the vast majority of large mammals native to South America, including all of those above 500 kilograms (1,100 lb). Though from the Last Glacial Maximum to the Holocene climatic optimum the area of suitable habitat for Lestodon decreased, mostly as a result of raised sea levels, the greater habitat reduction during the Last Interglacial (which Lestodon survived) suggests that climate change was not the primary driver of the extinction of Lestodon. The extinction interval of Lestodon and other megafauna coincides with the appearance and abundance of Fishtail points, which are suggested to have been used to hunt megafauna, across the Pampas region and South America more broadly, which may have been a contributory factor in the extinctions. At the Paso Otero 5 site in the Pampas of northeast Argentina, Fishtail points are associated with burned bones of Lestodon and other extinct megafauna. The bones appear to have been deliberately burned as a source of fuel. Due to the poor preservation of the bones there is no clear evidence of human modification.
