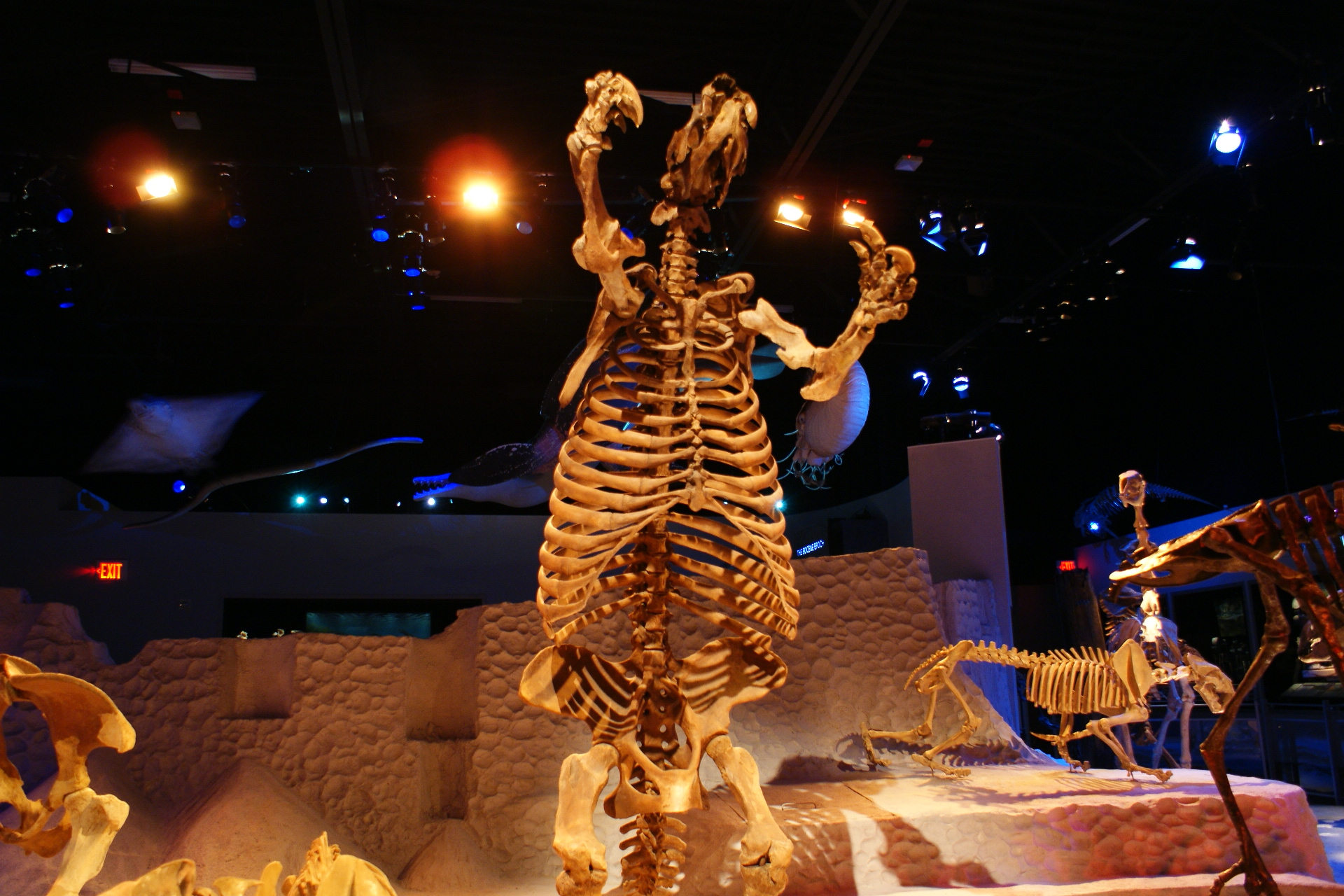
- T. segnis, Florida Museum of Natural History Fossil Hall at the University of Florida

Scientific classification
- Kingdom: Animalia
- Phylum: Chordata
- Class: Mammalia
- Order: Pilosa
- Family: †Mylodontidae
- Tribe: †Lestodontini
- Genus: †Thinobadistes; Hay 1919

Species
- T. segnis Hay 1919 (type); T. wetzeli Webb 1989

= Thinobadistes =

Thinobadistes Temporal range: Mid Miocene-Early Pliocene (Hemphillian) 10.3–4.9 Ma

Extinct genus of ground sloths

Thinobadistes is an extinct genus of ground sloth of the family Mylodontidae endemic to North America during the Miocene-Pliocene epochs (Hemphillian). It lived from 10.3 to 4.9 mya, existing for approximately 5.4 million years.

Thinobadistes and Pliometanastes were the first of the giant sloths to appear in N. America. Both Pliometanastes and Thinobadistes were in N. America before the Panamanian Land Bridge formed around 2.5 million years ago. It is then reasonable to presume that the ancestors of Thinobadistes island-hopped across the Central American Seaway from South America, where sloths in general first evolved.

== Description ==
Two specimens of Thinobadistes have been estimated to weigh 948 kg and 1066 kg each.

== History and taxonomy ==
The first reported discovery of Thinobadistes fossils came in 1887 when in Pleistocene deposits in Levy County, Florida, a member of the United States Geological Survey, possibly famous collector John Bell Hatcher, collected an astragalus of a large mylodontid, though the fossil was referred to Mylodon harlani until 1919. The fossil was made as the holotype (USNM 3335) of Thinobadistes segnis by Oliver P. Hay in 1919, who believed it was a close relative of Gnathopsis. Thinobadistes segnis' holotype was likely collected at "Mixon's Bone Bed", which was the site at which many more T. segnis fossils were found during the late 1930s and early 1940s by Frick Laboratory. These fossils gave a comprehensive view on the taxon, including fossils from the skull and teeth. It wasn't until 1989 that many of the fossils were fully described by S. D. Webb, who also described many more Thinobadistes fossils from areas like the Texas Panhandle and Withlacoochee River. Some of the younger and larger fossils were put into a new species, Thinobadistes wetzeli, which was also based on an astragalus found in Hemphillian deposits of the Withlacoochee River, Florida.

== Fossil distribution ==
Fossils of Thinobadistes segnis have only been found at 2 sites, both early Hemphillian, the type quarry at "Mixon's Bone Bed" in Levy County, Florida and a single partial molar found was at McGehee Farm in western Alachua County, Florida. The second named species, T. wetzeli, is from the lower early Hemphillian and has a wider distribution, with 2 sites containing fossils near the Withlacoochee River, Florida, 1 at Tyner Farm also in Alachua County, and material of a juvenile found in the Texas Panhandle. Fossils from an unknown species were found in the youngest Thinobadistes-bearing deposits at Coffee Ranch in the Texas Panhandle.
