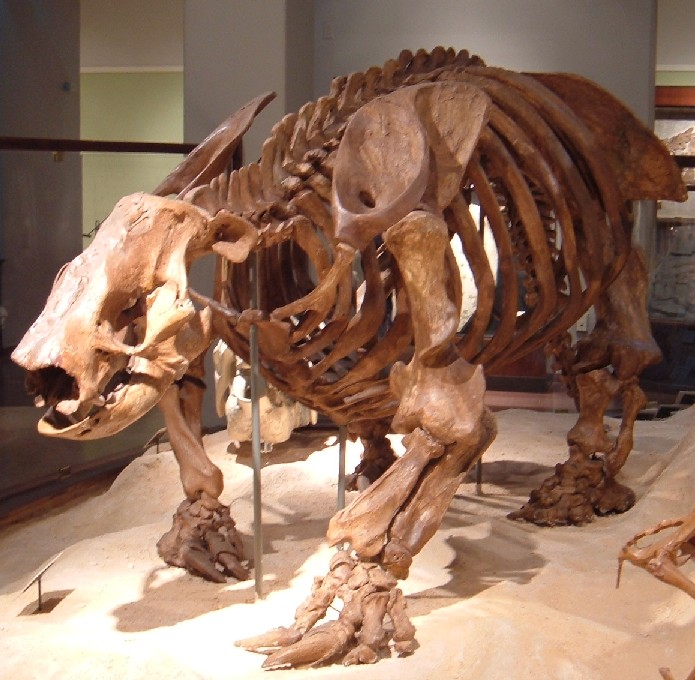
- Paramylodon harlani at the Texas Memorial Museum, UT

Scientific classification
- Domain: Eukaryota
- Kingdom: Animalia
- Phylum: Chordata
- Class: Mammalia
- Order: Pilosa
- Superfamily: Mylodontoidea
- Family: †Mylodontidae; Ameghino, 1889

Subgroups
- †Baraguatherium; †Eionaletherium; †Octodontotherium; †Octomylodon; †Orophodon; †Paroctodontotherium; †Pseudoprepotherium; †Urumacotherium; †Scelidotheriinae?; †Mylodontinae

= Mylodontidae =

Mylodontidae Temporal range: Late Oligocene-Early Holocene (Hemphillian-Rancholabrean) (NALMA) &(Deseadan-Lujanian) (SALMA) ~29–0.010 Ma

Extinct family of ground sloths

Mylodontidae is a family of extinct South American and North American ground sloths within the suborder Folivora of order Pilosa, living from around 23 million years ago (Mya) to 11,000 years ago. This family is most closely related to another family of extinct ground sloths, Scelidotheriidae, as well as to the extant arboreal two-toed sloths, family Choloepodidae; together these make up the superfamily Mylodontoidea. Phylogenetic analyses based on morphology uncovered the relationship between Mylodontidae and Scelidotheriidae; in fact, the latter was for a time considered a subfamily of mylodontids. However, molecular sequence comparisons were needed for the correct placement of Choloepodidae. These studies have been carried out using mitochondrial DNA sequences as well as with collagen amino acid sequences. The latter results indicate that Choloepodidae is closer to Mylodontidae than Scelidotheriidae is. The only other living sloth family, Bradypodidae (three-toed sloths), belongs to a different sloth radiation, Megatherioidea.

The mylodontoids form one of three major radiations of sloths. The discovery of their fossils in caverns associated with human occupation lead some early researchers to theorize that the early humans built corrals when they could procure a young ground sloth, to raise the animal to butchering size. However, radiocarbon dates do not support simultaneous occupation of the site by humans and sloths. Subfossil remains like coproliths, fur and skin have been discovered in some quantities. Mylodontids are the only ground sloths confirmed to have osteoderms embedded within their skin, though osteoderms were only present in a handful of genera (Mylodon, Paramylodon and Glossotherium) and absent in others.

== Phylogeny ==
The following sloth family phylogenetic tree is based on collagen and mitochondrial DNA sequence data (see Fig. 4 of Presslee et al., 2019).

- Folivora
  - † Megalocnidae (Caribbean sloths)
  - - Mylodontoidea
      - - † Scelidotheriidae
          - † Scelidodon sp.
          - † Scelidotherium sp.
      - - † Mylodontidae
          - † Lestodon armatus
          - - † Paramylodon harlani
            - - † Glossotherium robustus
              - † Mylodon darwinii
        - Choloepodidae (two-toed sloths)
          - Choloepus didactylus
          - Choloepus hoffmanni
    - Megatherioidea
      - - † Megalonychidae
        - Bradypodidae (three-toed sloths)
      - - † Nothrotheriidae
        - † Megatheriidae
