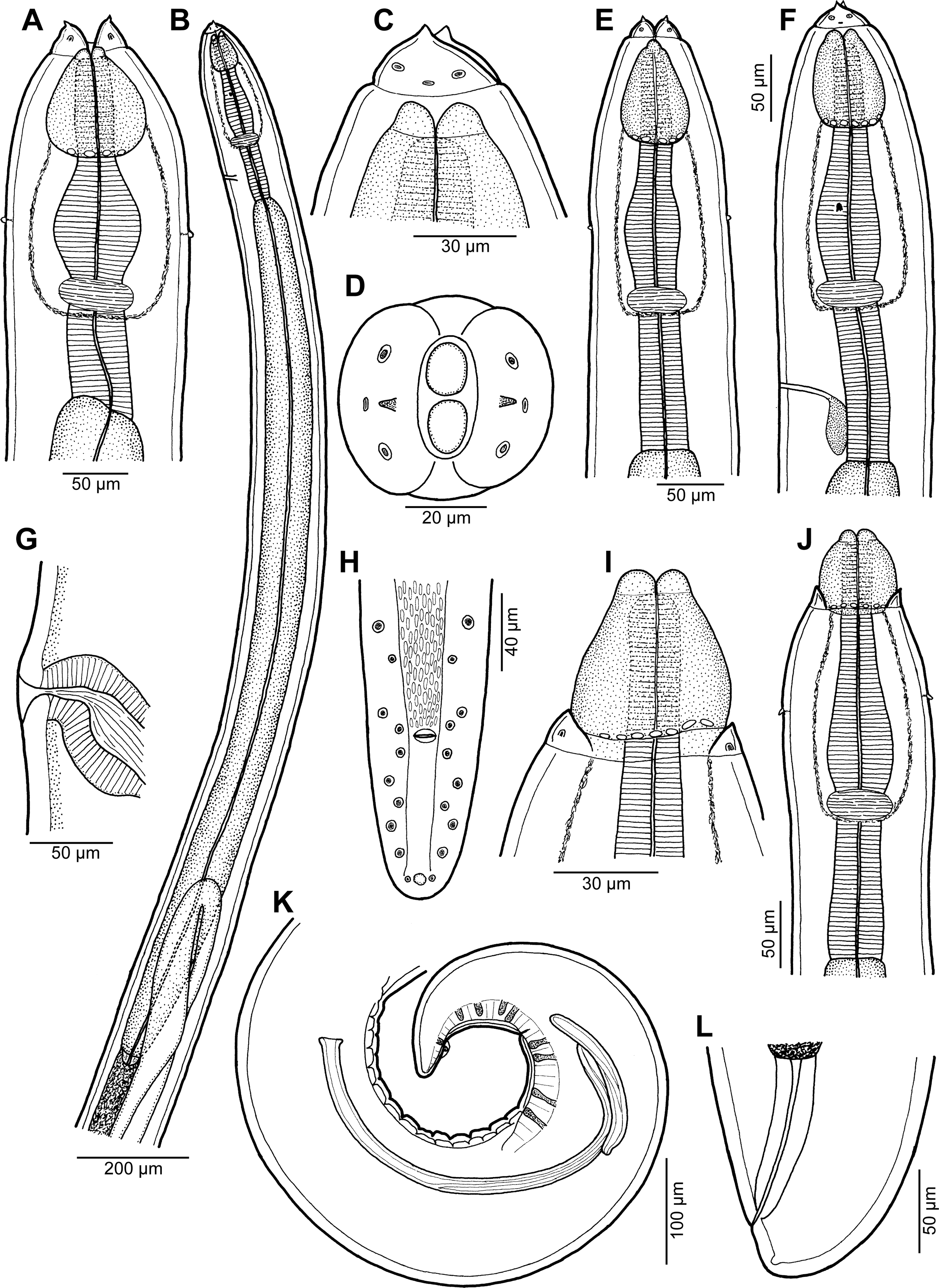
- Rasheedia heptacanthi

Scientific classification
- Kingdom: Animalia
- Phylum: Nematoda
- Class: Chromadorea
- Order: Rhabditida
- Family: Physalopteridae
- Genus: Rasheedia; Moravec & Justine, 2018

= Rasheedia =

Genus of roundworms

Rasheedia is a genus of nematodes in the order Spirurida. The nematode genus Bulbocephalus Rasheed, 1966 was found to be a homonym of Bulbocephalus Watson, 1916 (Apicomplexa, Stylocephalidae) and, therefore, a new name, Rasheedia n. nom., was proposed in 2018 to substitute it.

The genus was named in honour of Suraiya Rasheed, "a well-known Pakistani fish parasitologist who was the first to describe these interesting nematodes".

Species of Rasheedia are parasite of fish and include:

- Rasheedia deblocki (Le-Van-Hoa, Pham-Ngoc-Khue & Nguyen-Thi-Lien, 1972) Moravec & Justine, 2018
- Rasheedia heptacanthi Moravec & Justine, 2018, a parasite of the Cinnabar goatfish Parupeneus heptacanthus (Mullidae) and Dentex fourmanoiri (Sparidae)
- Rasheedia inglisi (Rasheed, 1966) Moravec & Justine, 2018
- Rasheedia novaecaledoniensis Moravec & Justine, 2018, a parasite of the Indian goatfish Parupeneus indicus (Mullidae)
- Rasheedia pseudupenei (Vassiliadès & Diaw, 1978) Moravec & Justine, 2018
