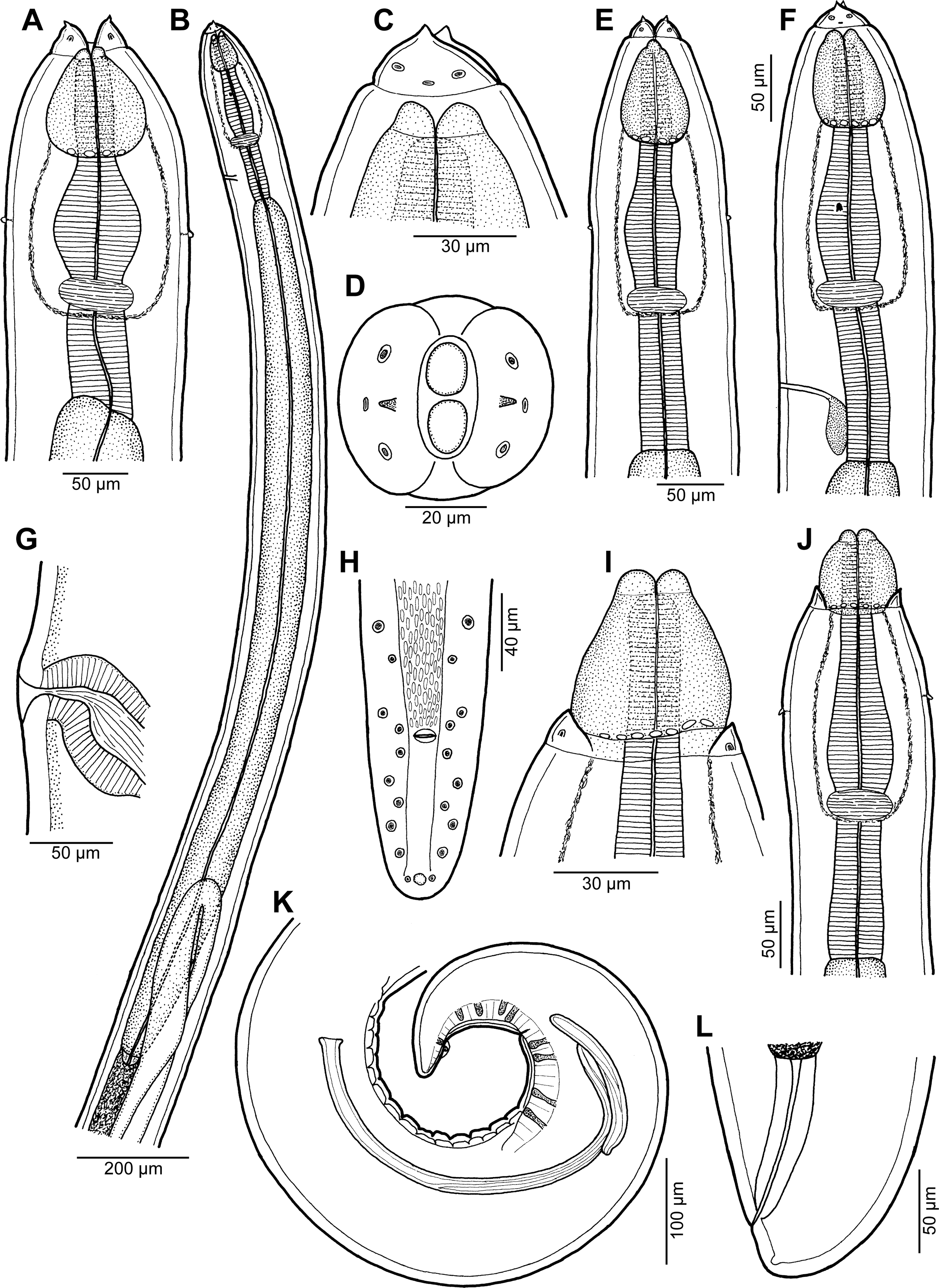
- Rasheedia heptacanthi

Scientific classification
- Kingdom: Animalia
- Phylum: Nematoda
- Class: Chromadorea
- Order: Rhabditida
- Family: Physalopteridae
- Genus: Rasheedia
- Species: R. heptacanthi

Binomial name
- Rasheedia heptacanthi Moravec & Justine, 2018

= Rasheedia heptacanthi =

Species of roundworm

Rasheedia heptacanthi is a parasitic nematode in the genus Rasheedia.

The species is an intestinal parasite of the Cinnabar goatfish Parupeneus heptacanthus (Mullidae) and Dentex fourmanoiri (Sparidae) off New Caledonia.

The two species Rasheedia heptacanthi and Rasheedia novaecaledoniensis, which both occur in New Caledonian waters, are mainly differentiated by the number of anterior protrusible oesophageal lobes (two in R. heptacanthi and four in R. novaecaledoniensis), structure of the oesophagus and the lengths of their spicules.

== Gallery: scanning electron microscopy of Rasheedia heptacanthi ==
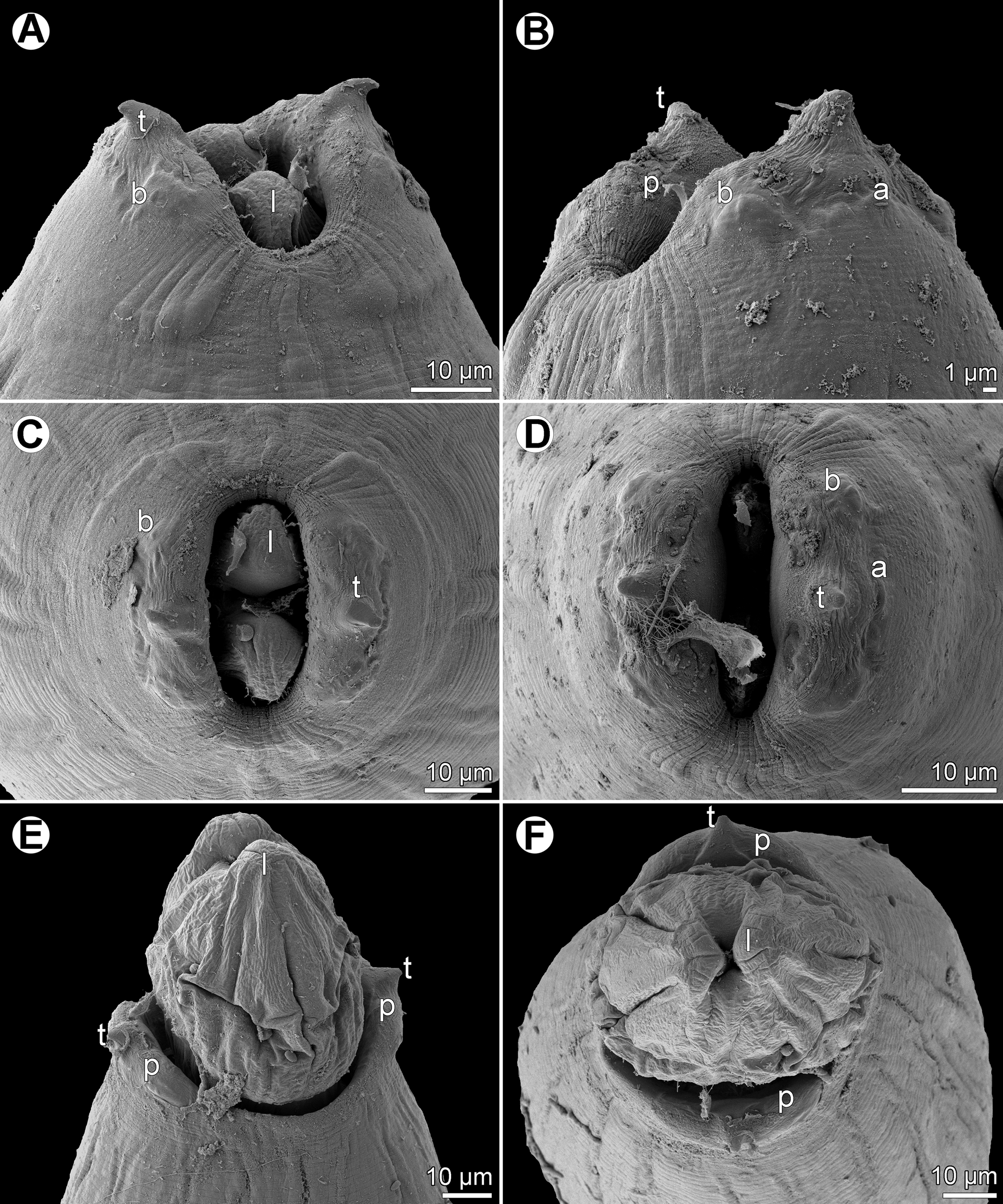
Head

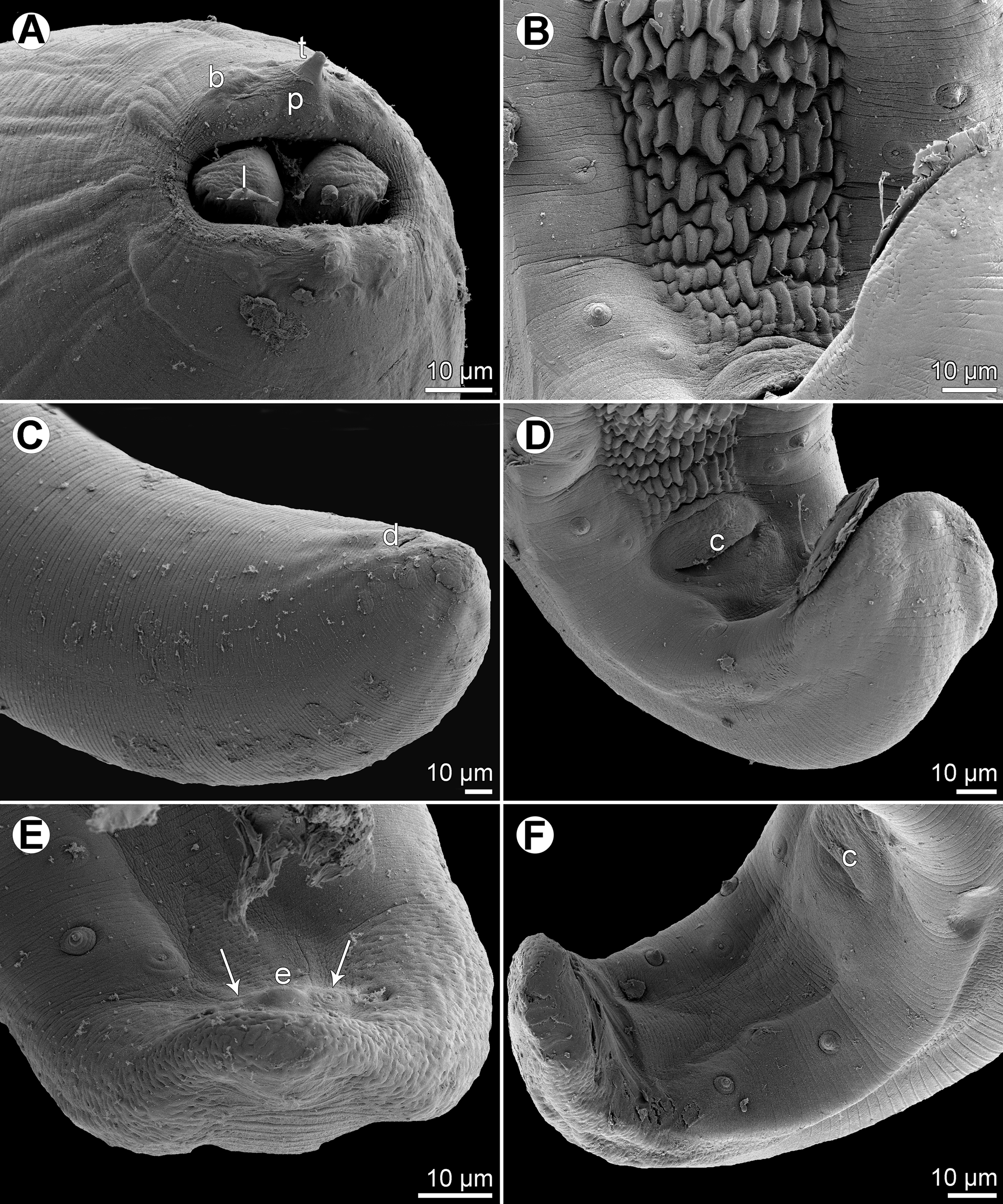
Tail

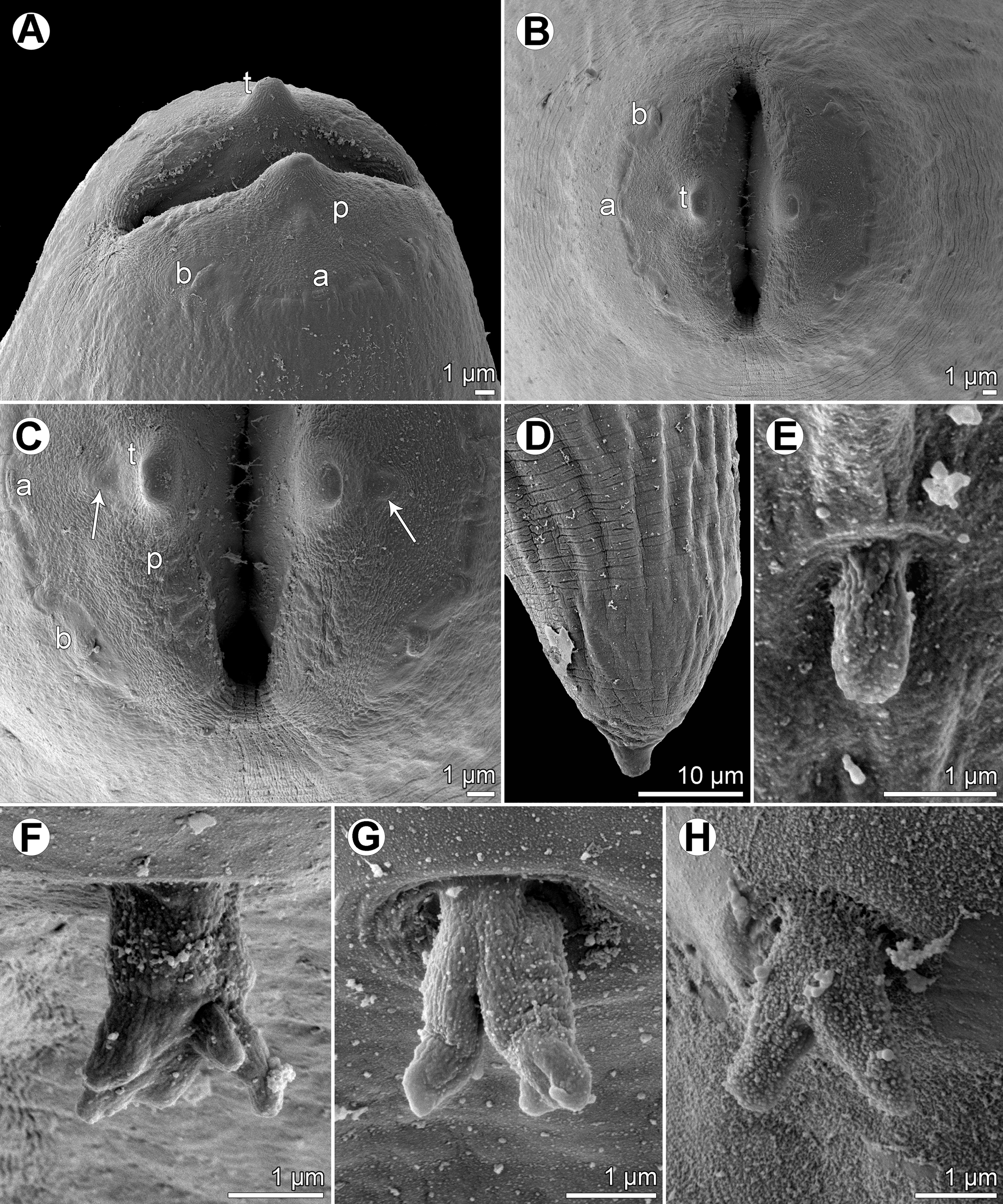
Various details
