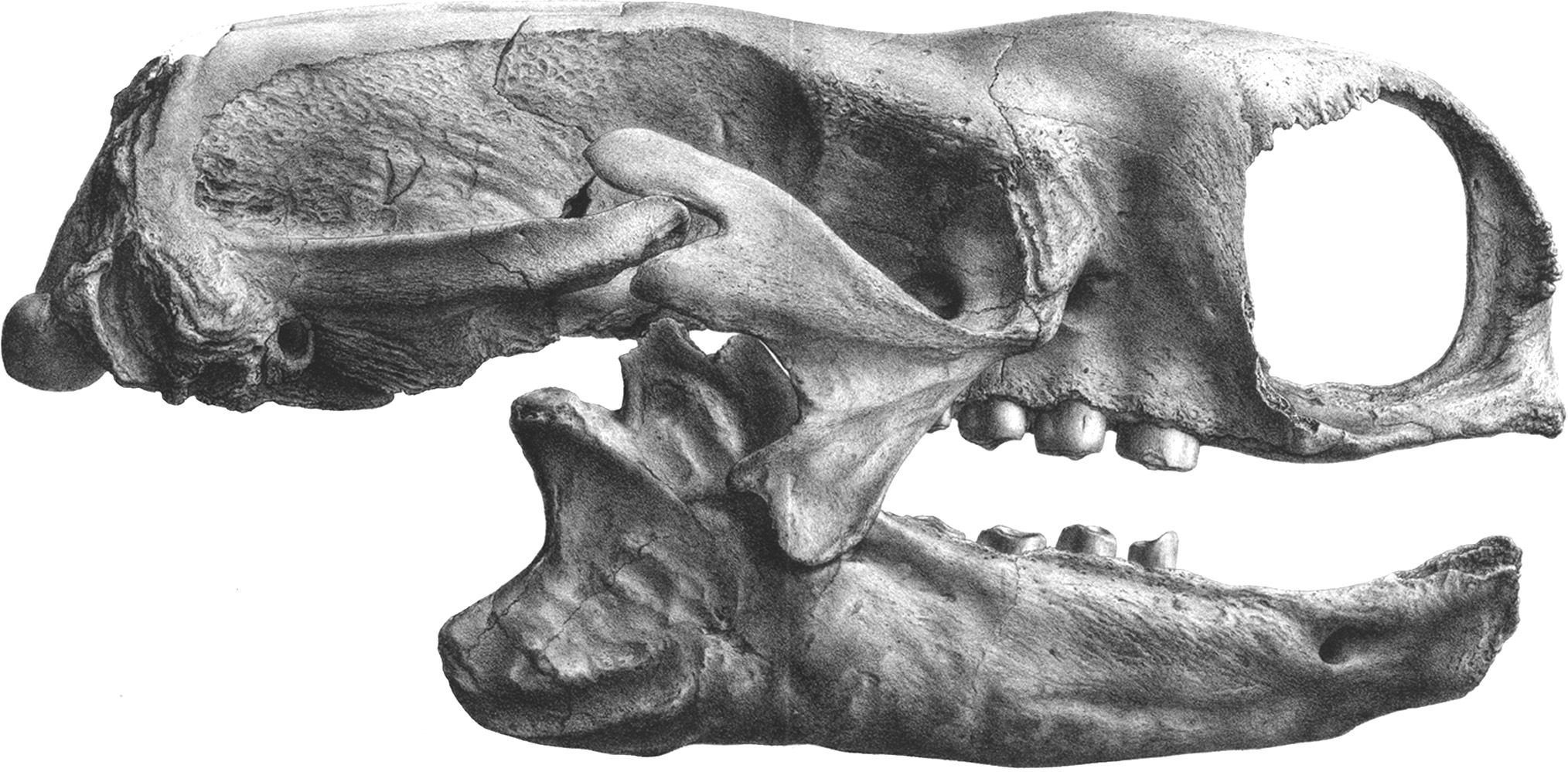
- Lithograph of the skull of Mylodon

Scientific classification
- Kingdom: Animalia
- Phylum: Chordata
- Class: Mammalia
- Order: Pilosa
- Suborder: Folivora
- Family: †Mylodontidae
- Tribe: †Mylodontini
- Genus: †Mylodon; Owen, 1840
- Species: †M. darwini

Binomial name
- †Mylodon darwini Owen, 1840

= Mylodon =

Mylodon Temporal range: ~1.95–0.01 Ma Early Pleistocene - Early Holocene

Extinct genus of mammals

Mylodon is an extinct genus of ground sloth belonging to the family Mylodontidae, known from southern South America. With a total length of 3 to 4 m and a body mass of 1-2 tonnes, it is one of the largest mylodontids, though it was considerably exceeded in size by the mylodontid Lestodon.

The oldest finds probably date to the Lower Pleistocene; however, most of the fossil remains date to the Late Pleistocene (spanning the Ensenadan and Lujanian faunal stages). Its distribution ranged from southern Bolivia and the Pampas in the north southwards to the southernmost part of Patagonia at around 52-53 degrees south, the furthest south of any Pleistocene ground sloth, with some of the best known remains of the species being from the eponymous Cueva del Milodon (cave of Mylodon) in southern Chile.

In addition to skeletal remains, Mylodon is also known from preserved skin and hair. Preserved dung (coprolites) indicates that Mylodon was a primarily a grazer, feeding on grasses and sedges. Mylodon has generally only a single recognised species, Mylodon darwini, which was described by Richard Owen in 1840 based on remains collected in the Pampas by Charles Darwin (for whom the species is named) during the Voyage of the Beagle. Some recent authors suggest that there were two species, with M. darwini restricted to the Pampas, with the Patagonian remains belonging to the separate species Mylodon listai.

Mylodon became extinct at the end of the Late Pleistocene-beginning of the Holocene, around 12–10,000 years ago, as part of the end-Pleistocene extinction event, along with other ground sloths and most large animals across the Americas. Mylodon chronologically overlapped with Paleoindians, the first humans to inhabit the Americas; evidence from several sites suggest that they may have hunted Mylodon. The extinction of Mylodon may be the result of climatic change, hunting by Paleoindians, or a combination of both factors.

== Discovery ==
Mylodon was named by Richard Owen on the basis of a nearly complete lower jaw with teeth, which was found by Charles Darwin in a consolidated gravel cliff at Bahía Blanca, during the survey expedition of HMS Beagle. At several sites, preserved hide and dung have been discovered, and are in such a state of conservation that the people who first discovered them believed they belonged to a living animal, instead of to an extinct species. The discovery of fresh-looking samples of skin and dung sparked a small wave of expeditions during the early 20th century to search for a living example of the animal. The samples have since been found to be around 10,000 years old, although they look fresh because of the extreme cold and stable conditions in the caves in which they were found.

Well preserved samples of Mylodon remains have been discovered in the Cueva del Milodón site in Patagonia, Chile along the southern flank of Cerro Benítez in the year 1896. Associated with bones of other early Patagonian animals, these remains of Mylodon date from an era earlier than 10,000 BC. The American Museum of Natural History has exhibited a sample of Mylodon dung from Argentina with a note that reads "deposited by Theodore Roosevelt".

== Description ==
=== General ===
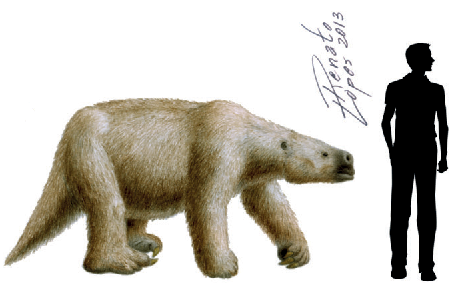
Size comparison of Mylodon darwini compared to a human

Mylodon was a large representative of the Mylodontidae. Its total length was estimated to be around 3 to 4 m. Based on the size of the skull, a weight between 1 and 2 tonnes is assumed, with an approximate estimate of 1.65 tonnes. Thus, Mylodon had about the size of related forms such as Glossotherium or Paramylodon, but was significantly smaller than the giant Lestodon. In terms of physique, it largely corresponded with the other large ground-living sloths.

=== Skull and dentition features ===
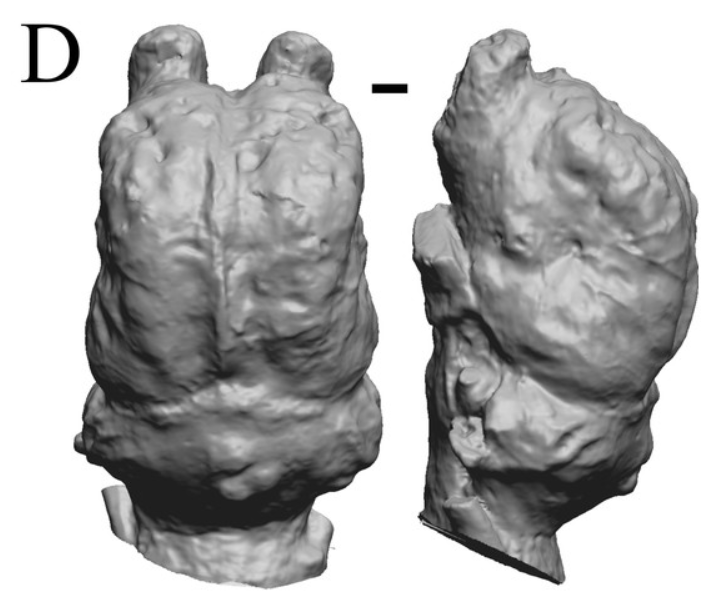
Digital endocast of the cranial cavity of Mylodon (LACM 157696).

Especially in the construction of the skull, Mylodon differed significantly from other related forms. Its length varied between 59 and 71.5 cm, which is significantly longer than Glossotherium or Lestodon. At the skull it was between 16.5 and 22.5 cm wide, in the front nasal area between 11.3 and 15.5 cm. The height of the posterior skull was 14.0 to 19.0 cm and the anterior 15.0 to 23.5 cm. The skull was thereby elongated and narrow, unlike Glossotherium and Lestodon that had a short and very broad skull. The extraordinary length of the skull of Mylodon was mainly due to elongations in the rostrum. Seen from above, the rostrum narrowed towards the front. This is where the most important difference to most of the other representatives of the Mylodontidae can be found: The nasal bone was long and narrow and curved downwards in the front area. At the front end, it connected to the middle jawbone, which was lengthened by an appendage, and which in turn fused with the upper jaw. This resulted in a completely closed nasal arch in adult individuals, which is largely unknown in other sloths. In comparison, the skulls of Glossotherium and Lestodon, but also of Paramylodon, showed a nasal area, seen from above, which was rather short and looked clearly cut off when viewed from the side; the roof of the skull was largely straight in Mylodon, only a slight indentation could occur above the orbit. On parietal, significant temporal lines were present, but no head crest formed. The zygomatic arch was slim, the anterior attachment began above the third and fourth molars. It did not form a solid end with the rear arch attachment. As is usual with sloths, the front arch base consisted of three appendages: one ascending, one horizontal, and one descending, the former of which was the longest. The rear arch formed a triangular plate. The occiput bent at an angle of 120° from the roof of the skull. The underside of the occiput was at about the level of the occlusal plane. When viewed from behind, the occiput appeared almost circular and not as depressed as in Glossotherium and Lestodon. The palate was narrow and was more or less triangularly oriented towards the front of the skull. Numerous small bone openings were characteristic here. The glenoid pit, in which the joint of the lower jaw engages, corresponding to that of other mylodonts with its weak form, but this provided free rotation overall.

The lower jaw of Mylodon varied in length between 42 and 48 cm. It was elongated, more noticeable than in Glossotherium and Lestodon, since in Mylodon the area in front of the teeth, in particular, is strongly elongated. The horizontal bone body increased continuously in height towards the rear, below the last molar it was about 10.5 to 12.7 cm. The symphysis at the front end for the jointing of the two halves of the lower jaw was about 12.4 cm long. Here the lower edge of the body of the lower jaw rose at an angle so that the anterior end of the symphysis was above the occlusal plane of the teeth. As with other sloths, the symphysis extended forward, it ended slightly rounded. According to the rostrum of the skull, Mylodon's symphysis was narrow and not as wide as in Glossotherium and Lestodon. The mandible foramen opened shortly behind the symphysis. The ascending branch started behind the last molar and formed an angle of 140° to the occlusal plane. The crown process rose up to 20 cm. In contrast, the articular process was lower, roughly at the level of the occlusal plane, resulting in a low cranial-mandibular connection. The angular process at the rear end of the lower jaw was clearly visible. Sometimes it tipped down and was below the lower edge of the horizontal bone body. The upper side of the angular process does not reach the occlusal plane.

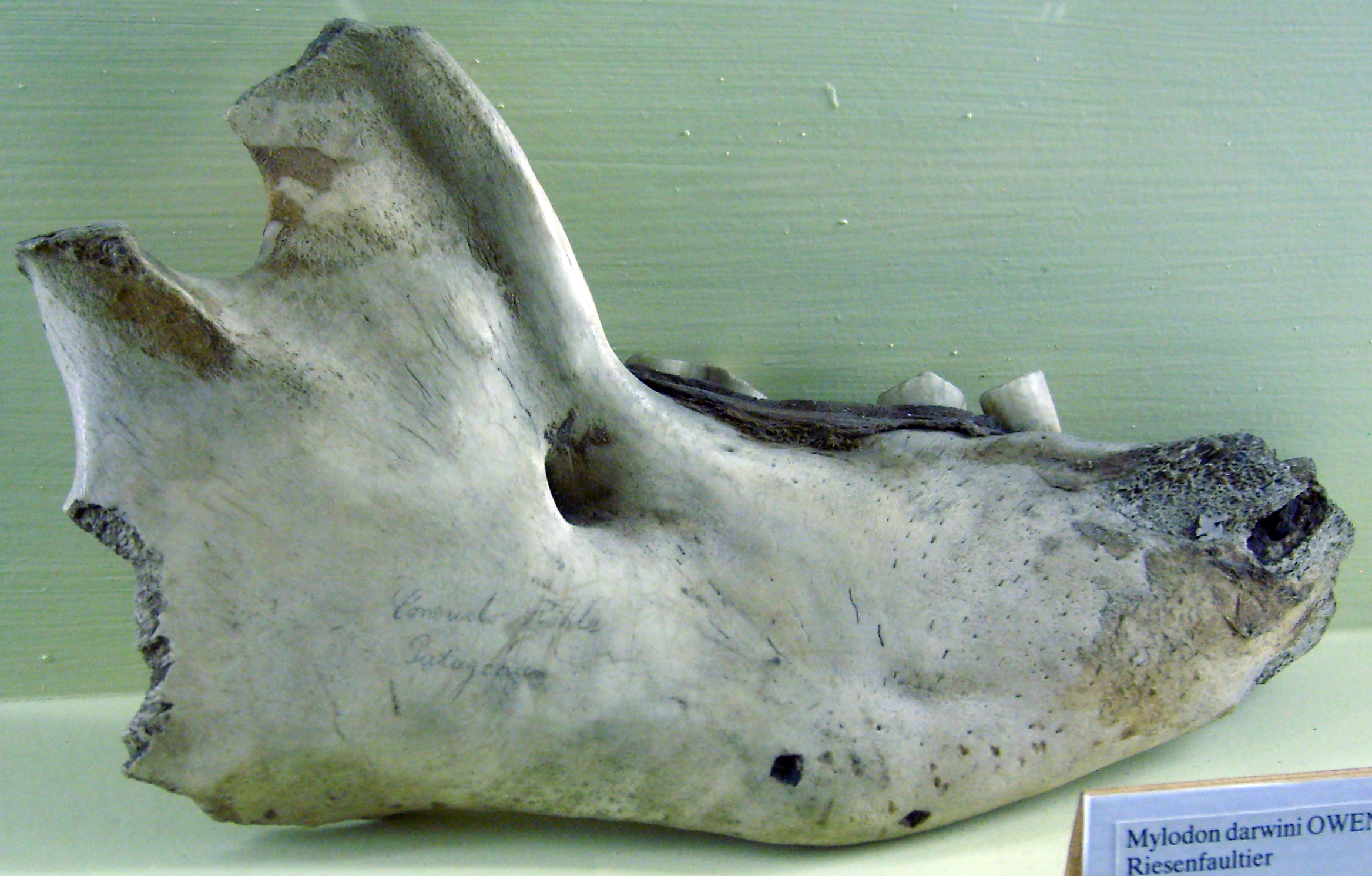
Lower jaw of Mylodon

The dentition of Mylodon differs greatly from that of the other placental mammals and usually consists of five teeth at the top and four teeth at the bottom per jaw arch, meaning a total of 18 teeth. In the mylodonts, the first tooth was often caniniform while the rear teeth were more molariform. Within the sloth, this structure of the teeth can be called original. A special feature of Mylodon was that the upper canine-like tooth of each row was completely regressed and only the molar-like four rear teeth were found here. In the lower row of teeth, the anterior caniniform tooth was transformed into a molariform. The dentition thus consisted of a total of 16 teeth. This is somewhat reminiscent of Paramylodon, in which the upper canine-shaped teeth were also missing, but the lower ones had retained their strikingly pointed shape. In contrast to this, Glossotherium and Lestodon had the original decayed teeth. The flat, flap-like and largely indented structure of the molariform teeth can be emphasized as a characteristic of the mylodonts, which clearly differs from that of the Megatheriidae and Megalonychidae with their two transverse raised ridges per tooth. The shapes of the teeth present in Mylodon were simpler. In the upper jaw row, they had a rather round to oval outline, in the lower jaw row a more diamond-shaped outline. The typically more complex bilobed design of the molar-like teeth of Glossotherium and Lestodon, caused by a central constriction, only occurred on the lower rearmost tooth in Mylodon. In general, the rows of teeth diverged to the front, and the teeth were very high crowned (hypsodont). The upper row of teeth ranges in length from 10.9 to 13.3 cm, the lower row was between 12.0 and 15.0 cm in length.

=== Postcrania ===
Postcranial skeletons are far rarer in Mylodon than in the other large mylodontid sloths. As a result, the skeleton is less well documented. Only individual elements of the spine, such as the atlas and various thoracic vertebrae, have been described. The humerus was massive and extremely long at 46 to 48 cm. The joint head, the diameter of which was over 10 cm, stood out due to its hemispherical, but laterally somewhat flattened shape. A distinct deltopectoral ridge ran down the shaft, which acted as an anchor point for the shoulder muscles. As with many ground sloths, the lower end of the joint extended far and brought it here to a width of almost 26 cm. In part, this was caused by a massive internal epicondyle. The articular surfaces (capitulum and trochlea) were almost perpendicular to each other and did not form such an obtuse angle as in Glossotherium. The cubit was built gracefully. Their length was around 37 cm. The olecranon, i.e. the upper articular process, took up about 8.1 cm of it, which corresponds to about 22% of the total length and is significantly less than in comparison with Glossotherium and Lestodon. It was laterally narrowed, which is also found in Paramylodon. The spoke largely resembled that of Glossotherium and was compact and straight built with a length of about 30 cm. The head was oval in shape with a prominent lip. The pelvis was extremely expansive and 114 cm wide between the two iliac bones. The thigh bone measured between 55 and 59 cm in length. It was typical of ground sloths, being flat in shape. Its width decreased significantly on the shaft, the lowest value was reached just below the midpoint. Here the width was about 18 cm, the thickness about 7.5 cm. The joint ends, on the other hand, were markedly wider, around 30 cm at the knee end and around 26 cm at the foot end. The thighbone reached the shin with only about half of its length, a characteristic of mylodonts. This bone, too, was clearly flat with a thickness that was only half the value of the width at the shaft. The fibula is so far only fragmented. It was drawn in on the shaft and widened at the joint ends, with the upper joint end showing more pronounced curves than in Glossotherium.

The hand comprised a total of five digits (I to V), whereby the metacarpal bone was fused with the large polygonal bone on the first digit. This created the so-called Metacrapal Carpal Complex (MCC for short), which is typical for many ground sloths. As a special feature of the wrist, the pea bone was clearly flat, its shape resembled that of Glossotherium, but differed from the corresponding bone of other Mylodonts with spherical, walnut-like or a pyramidal shape. The fourth digit had formed the longest metacarpal bone, while that of the fifth was only slightly shorter. The respective bones measured there around 12.5 and 10.7 cm in length. As with Glossotherium and Paramylodon, only the three inner digits were probably clawed, but only of the second digit have all bone elements been documented. The metacarpal bone was 7.8 cm long and was built very gracefully. The first phalanx was extremely short and only about 2.5 cm long, the second was about 4.2 cm long and the third at least 11.5 cm. It was tubular and went forward into an extension on which the claw rested. The first phalanges of the two outer digits were significantly reduced in length. Only individual root bones of the foot, such as the talus, are present.

=== Integument ===
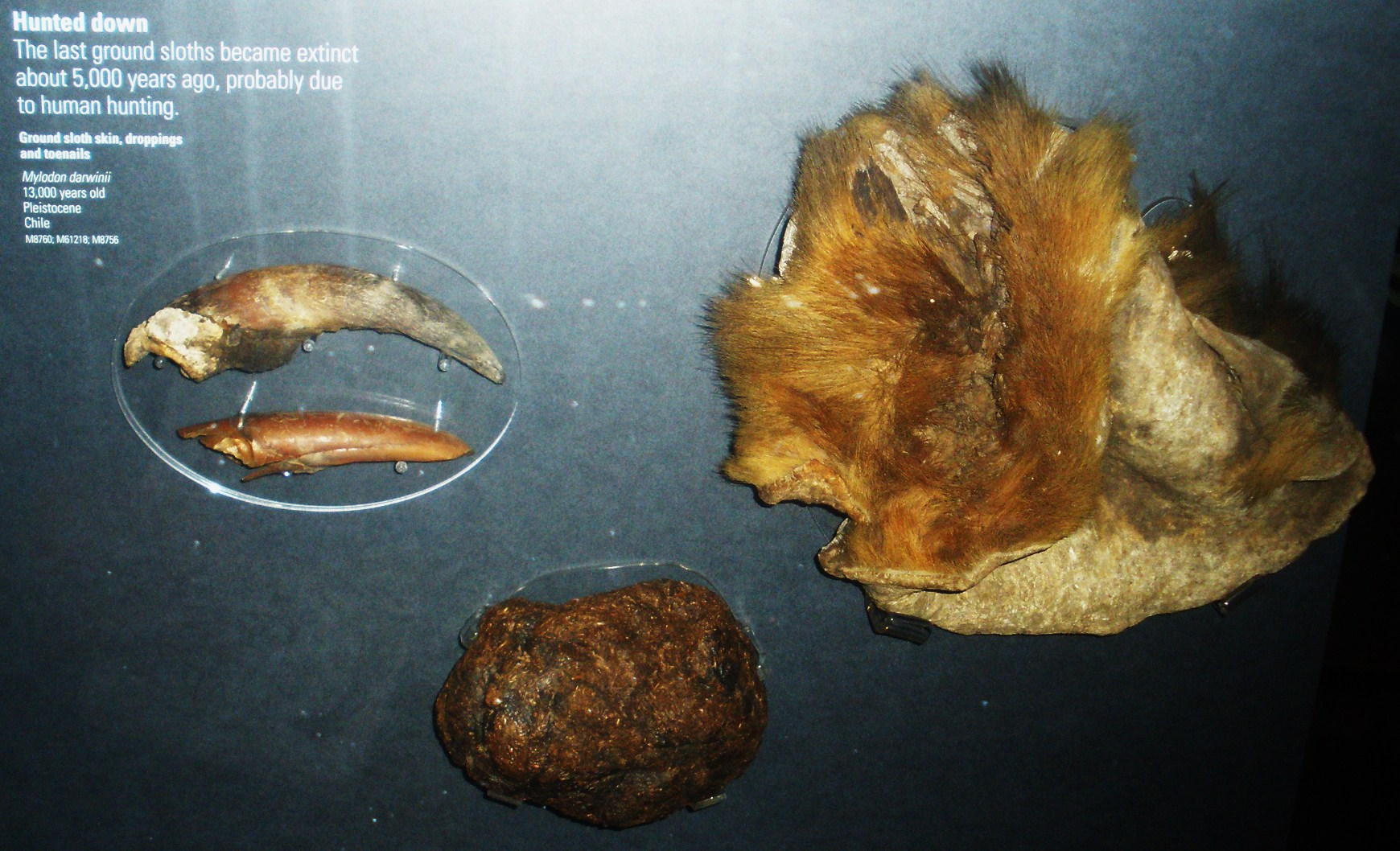
Toenails, dung and skin, Natural History Museum, London

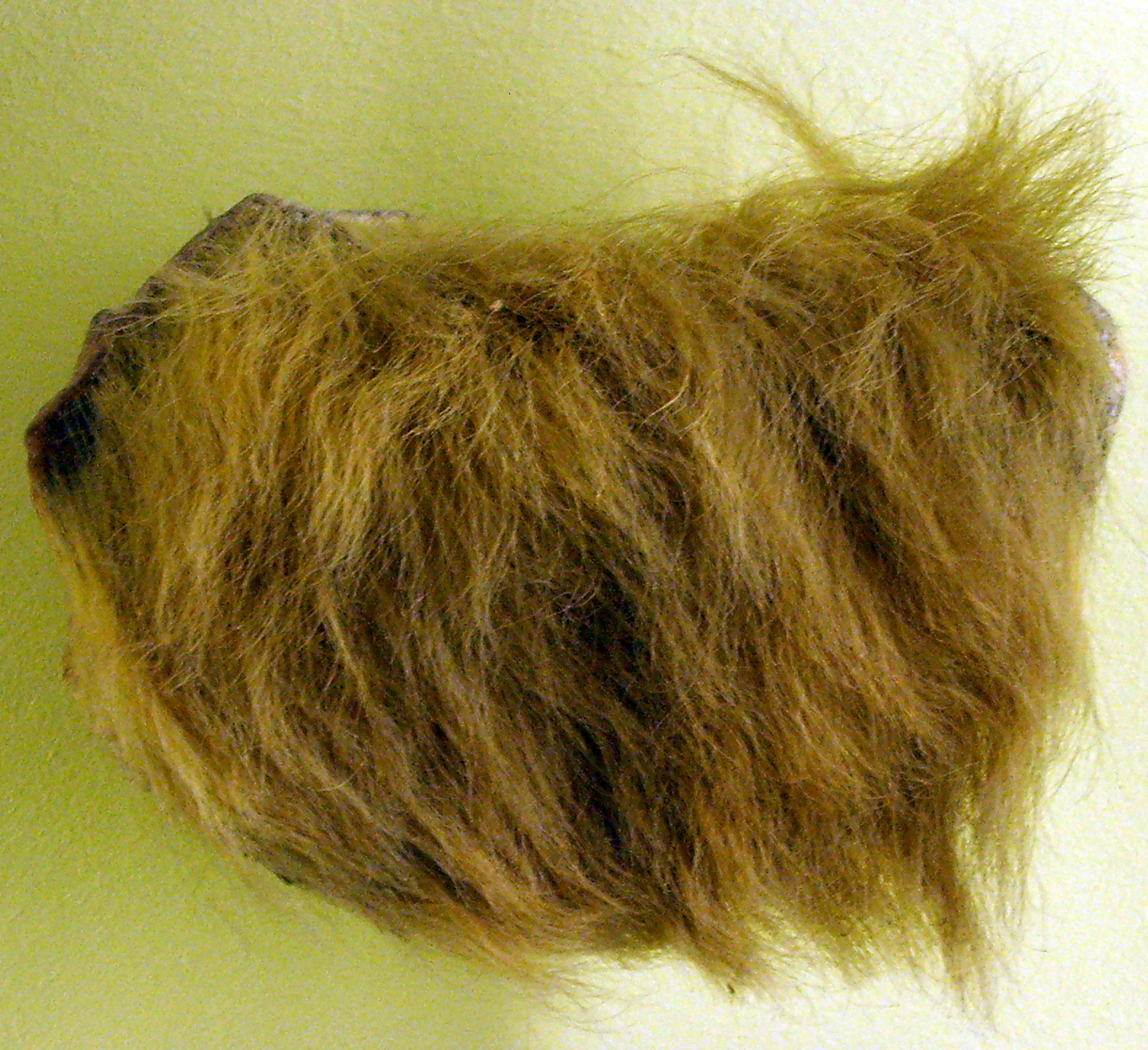
Fur and skin at the Museum für Naturkunde, Berlin

Mylodon is one of the few extinct mammals that has mummified skin remains. The most important location for such finds is the Cueva del Milodón in the Chilean province of Última Esperanza, where the first skin parts were brought to light at the end of the 19th century. Individual pieces have lengths of up to 150 cm, but have shrunk through drying processes. Its thickness is up to 1.5 cm in some places, but it is usually around 1 cm. The skin is densely covered with stiff, slightly wavy hair, with only the top hair being developed, while the undercoat is missing. This feature is similar to the two-toed sloths but less so than the three-toed sloths, which possess an undercoat. The length of the individual hairs vary between 5 and sometimes over 20 cm with the shortest in the area of the back of the head, medium-length hair on the back and very long hair on the limbs. Their known color ranges from yellowish to reddish-brown. The hair shafts are uniformly tubular, at the upper end they form blunt tips. As with today's sloths, the hair did not have a pith (medulla). In contrast to the hair of the two-toed sloth, they lack their characteristic longitudinal ribbing.

The mylodonts are the only representatives of the sloths to have bony plates embedded in their skin. Such structures, called osteoderms, are known today to a greater extent only in armadillos. In contrast to the outer armor of the armadillos, the bone platelets of the mylodonts were rather loosely scattered. Hermann Burmeister published the first finds of individual osteoderms of Mylodon as early as the 1860s. The remains of skin found in the caves of Última Esperanza give an impression of how they were embedded in the skin and distributed over the body. The bone platelets are all located in the lower section of the skin, while the hairs originate in the upper sections. The distribution turned out to be very inconsistent. Some areas with a dense array of osteoderms contain between 83 and 95 platelets per 10 cm^{2}. For others, however, the number is very thin. However, even with a close arrangement, the osteoderms never unite to form a closed shell, but are always separated from one another by individual skin folds. In accordance with the armadillos' shells, the bone platelets form a single layer and do not appear stacked. Since all skin residues were found isolated from the body skeletons, it is sometimes difficult to assign the skin areas with a dense and thin arrangement of bone platelets to a specific part of the body. However, it can be assumed that the back was largely armored and the stomach was free. In the sections with dense osteoderm formation, these were larger than in the clear areas. The bone platelets of Mylodon were mostly of irregular oval shape with dimensions of 0.5 to 2.5 cm in length, 0.3 to 1.8 cm in width and 0.2 to 1.1 cm in thickness, with weights of a maximum of 2 g. On the surface, they showed individual dimples. In cross-section, they consisted of numerous bundles of fibers mixed with hard bone blades (osteoma). This made their structure much simpler than that of the armadillos, and they probably lacked the keratin layer known from the armadillos. In principle, the osteoderms of Mylodon were similar to those of other large mylodonts.

== Distribution and important fossil finds ==
=== Overview and origins ===
Mylodon was mainly distributed in the southern part of South America. Fossil finds are known from Argentina, Chile, southern Bolivia, Uruguay, Paraguay and southern Brazil. Thus, the colonized regions include very far southern sites on the island of Tierra del Fuego as well as most of Patagonia northward to the Pampas region. Its northern limit was around 19.6° S, while its southern limit reached the range at about 53° south. The Tres Arroyos site on Tierra del Fuego and the region around Cueva del Milodón in southwestern Patagonia are among the southernmost known records of a sloth representative in the Pleistocene. In the Pampa region, the northern limit was found approximately at the Chuí River in the southeastern Brazilian state of Rio Grande do Sul around 30 degrees south latitude. Even more northerly points of discovery, such as Ñuapua in Bolivia, are tangent to the 20th parallel south. Finds reported from Paraguay, however, are considered rather uncertain.

The first occurrence of Mylodon comes from the Ensenadan faunal stage (1.95 Ma - 0.4Ma) but finds are rather rare. During this period, the possibly closely related form Archaeomylodon also occurred in the Pampas region, whose foremost canine teeth of the upper dentition were greatly reduced in size, but not yet completely reduced. Among the more northerly finds of Mylodon is a skull from the El Palmar Formation in the Argentine province of Entre Ríos, which dates to the end of the last warm period about 80,000 years ago. Also from the northern distribution areas two partial skeletons are worth mentioning, one of which was found at the Río Anisacate in the Argentine province of Córdoba and the other in Arroyo Quequén Salado near Oriente in the Argentine province of Buenos Aires. Mainly in the Pampas, there was an overlap in the occurrence of Mylodon with the two other major mylodontid sloth representatives Glossotherium and Lestodon during the Upper Pleistocene. However, actual co-occurrence is rarely attested. These include the important archaeological site of Paso Otero in Buenos Aires Province, the locality of Arroyo de Vizcaíno in southern Uruguay, and the Chuí River.

=== Important Upper Pleistocene finds ===
As with many of the other large ground sloths, most of the Mylodon material is from the Upper Pleistocene, with a focus toward the end of the last glacial period. It is also the phase when Mylodon again disappeared from the fossil record. From a global perspective, numerous larger animals became extinct during the transition from the Pleistocene to the Holocene, which is why this event is considered a Quaternary extinction wave. In South America, this coincides with the first appearance of humans. Whether the two are causally related is the subject of much controversy. In addition to potential hunting and possible landscape overprinting by early human hunter-gatherer groups, climatic changes may also have had an influence. Numerous archaeological sites, especially in the Pampa region and in the Patagonian area, are between 13,500 and 10,000 years old. The majority of these attest to at least a coexistence of humans and ground sloths over an extended period of time. Direct associations of human cultural products and fossil remains of Mylodon are found, among others, at Gruta del Indio in the eastern foothills of the Andes, at Piedra Museo or Las Buitreras, all in Argentina, and at Tres Arroyos in Tierra del Fuego, respectively.

Mylodon is often represented by isolated osteoderms, bones or in the form of coprolites, while human remains are limited to stone artifacts and/or hearths. Whether this also involved a more or less intensive raw material use of sloth bones on the part of humans is in many cases unproven. Numerous bone marks that were originally interpreted as anthropogenically caused are, according to recent studies, due to predation. Evidence of direct hunting by humans of the large ground sloths is even more difficult. One piece of evidence is often considered to be Quebrada de Quereo, a site on an ancient coastline in northern Chile. From here come, among other things, skeletal remains of two individuals of Mylodon, distributed in each case over a narrowly defined area, but in two different stratigraphic units and at a spatial distance of 21 m from each other. One of the individuals was associated with about 70 stone objects, whose anthropogenic origin is under discussion. No cut marks are found on the bones as evidence of any human manipulation. The age of the site is given as 11,600 to 10,900 years before present.

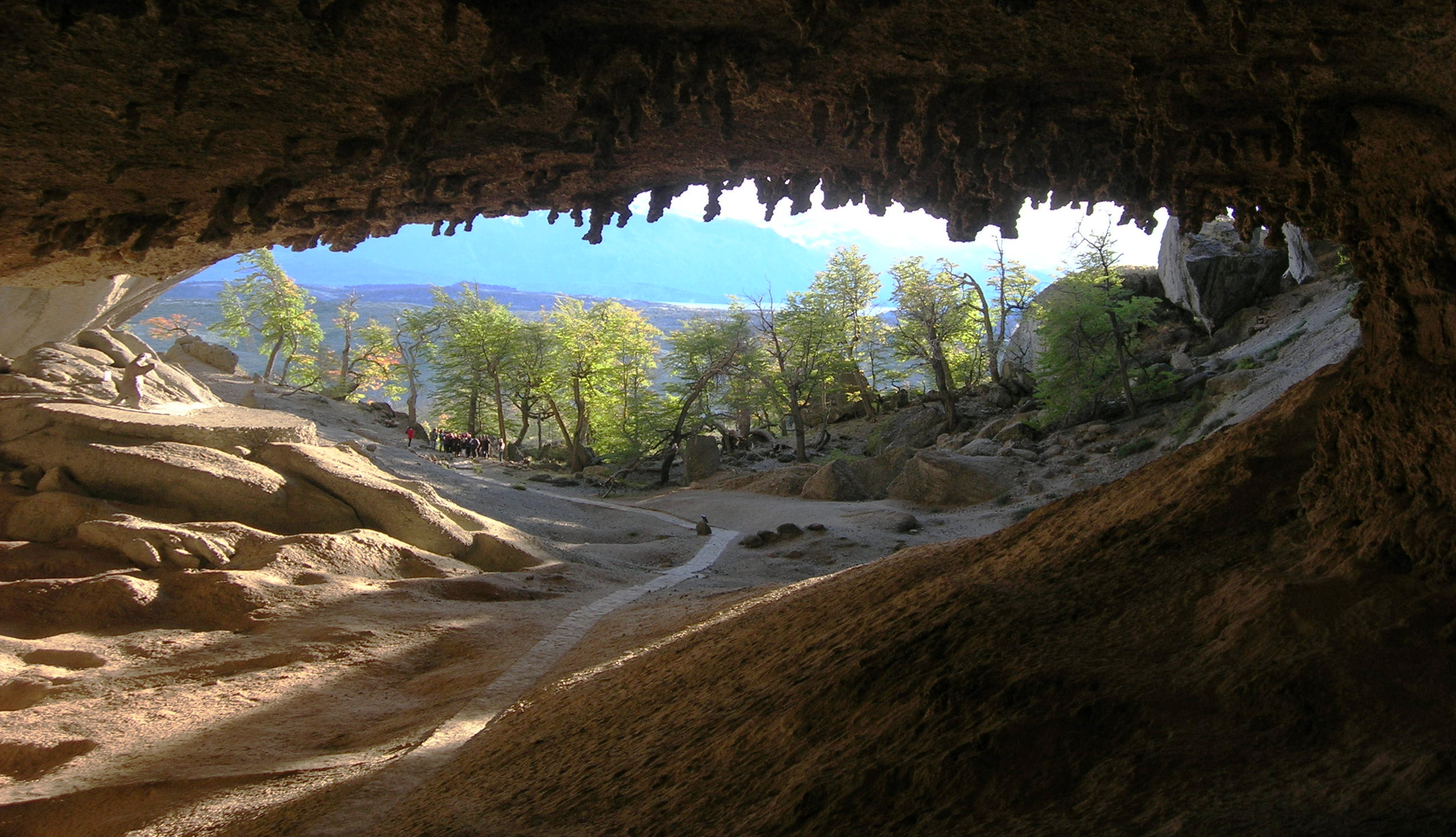
Entrance of Cueva del Milodón

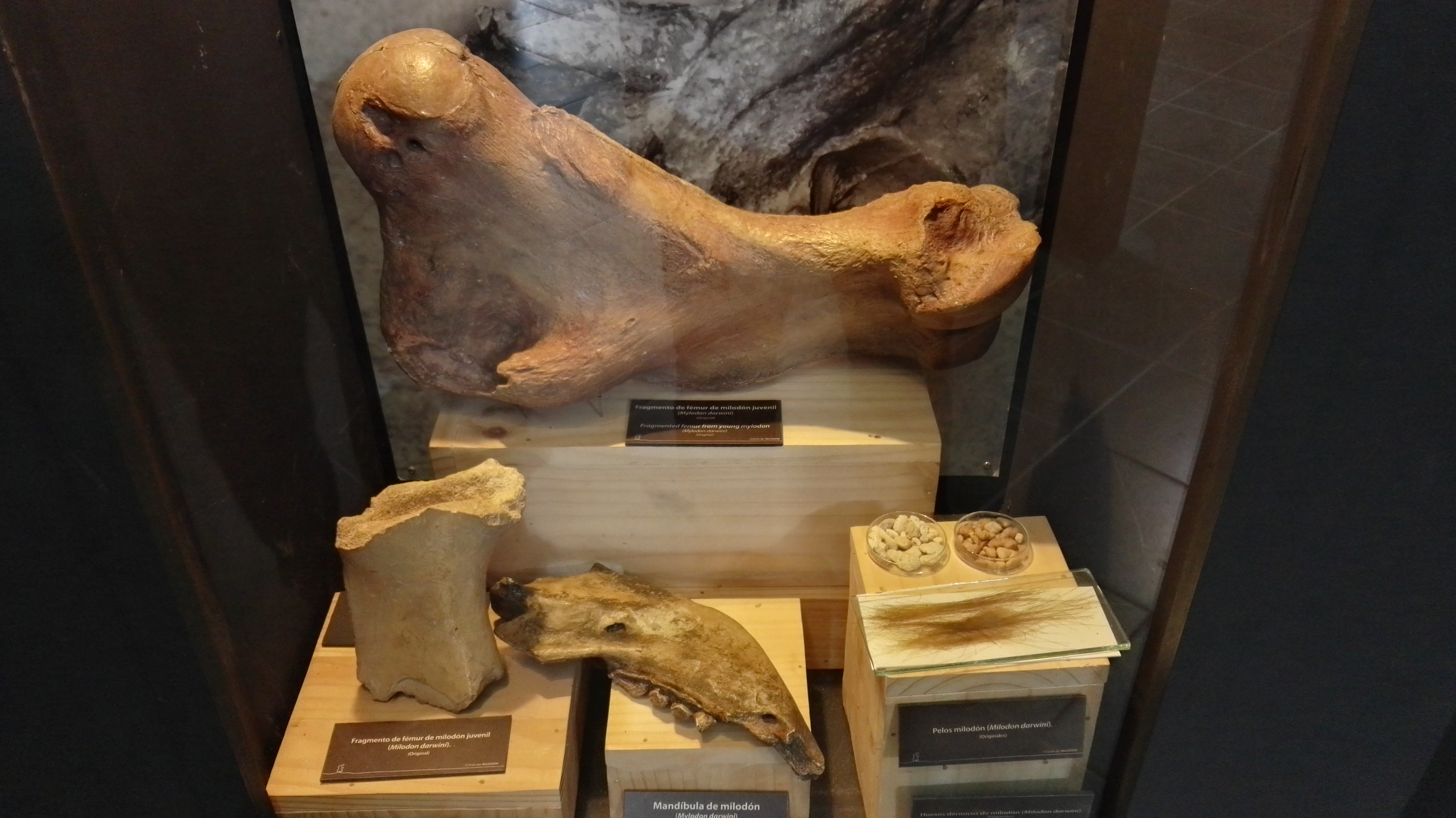
Various finds of Mylodon from Cueva del Milodón (femur, mandible, hair)

One of the most important sites is the Cueva del Milodón near Lago Sofía in the Chilean province of Última Esperanza, known mainly for its surviving skin remains. It is part of a whole system of caves in the region, such as the Cueva del Medio or the Cueva Chica, which line the southern flank of the 556 m high Cerro Benitez like pearls. Cueva del Milodón is a large cave 250 m long, 140 m wide and 30 m high at the entrance and 10 m at the back, respectively. It was discovered in 1895 by the German captain Hermann Eberhard, who also found the first skin remains. The great importance of these finds led to the cave, initially known as "Cueva Eberhardt", being subsequently visited and explored by numerous scientists. As a result, a large number of finds accumulated over time, among which Mylodon with bone remains, and numerous coprolites has a large share. Other finds belong to camels such as Lama, horses such as Hippidion or South American ungulates such as Macrauchenia, in addition, several predators are represented, including the jaguar, Smilodon as a member of the saber-toothed cats, and the giant bear form Arctotherium. Some of the mammal bones have marks that were originally associated with human activity, but the current view is that they are more likely due to predator browsing. In addition to faunal remains, the cave also held a myriad of botanical material. It also yielded one of the most extensive data sequences from the Upper Pleistocene. Several radiocarbon dates, measured from a wide variety of Mylodon finds, span a period from about 16,700 to 10,200 years ago. The upper data are among the most recent obtained directly from finds of the sloth vertebrate.

== Taxonomy ==
Mylodon's close relatives include the ground sloths of the genera Glossotherium and Paramylodon. The latter genus has often been confused with Glossotherium, but Paramylodon is a distinct genus that was restricted to the Pleistocene of North America. Glossotherium also shares a long history of taxonomic confusion with Mylodon, and currently the only recognized species is Mylodon darwini. At one time, the elephant-sized Megatherium was thought to be closely related, but is recognized as belonging to a separate family (Megatheriidae).

Below is a phylogenetic tree of the Mylodontidae, based on the work of Boscaini et al.. 2019.

- Mylodontidae
  - - Urumacotherium
    - Pseudoprepotherium
  - - - Paroctodontotherium
      - Octodontotherium
    - - Brievabradys
      - Mylodontinae
        - Lestodontini
          - - Lestodon
            - Bolivartherium
          - - Thinobadistes
            - - Sphenotherus
              - Lestobradys
        - Mylodontini
          - Pleurolestodon
          - - - Glossotheridium
              - Simomylodon
            - - - - Kiyumylodon
                  - Mylodon
                - Paramylodon
              - Glossotherium

Recent molecular sequence results obtained using collagen and mitochondrial DNA extracted from fossils indicate that the closest living relatives of Mylodon are the two-toed sloths of genus Choloepus. This revelation came as a surprise, since morphological analyses had previously suggested that two-toed sloths were close to Caribbean sloths and Megalonyx, now regarded as representing two separate and distant branches of the sloth evolutionary tree.

Some authors suggest that there were two species, with M. darwini restricted to the Pampas, with the Patagonian remains belonging to the separate species Mylodon listai.

== History of research ==
=== First description ===
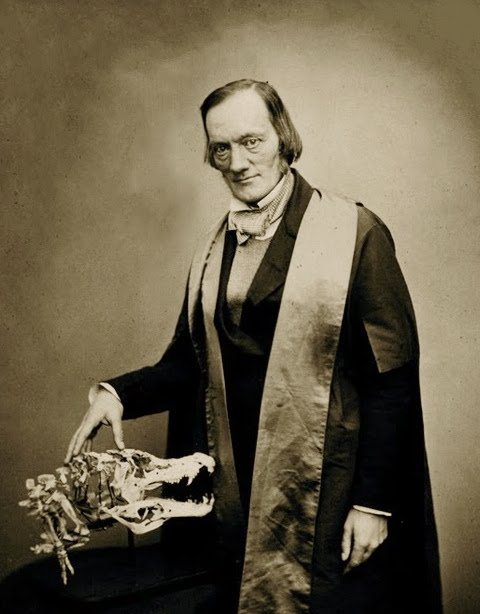
Richard Owen (1856)

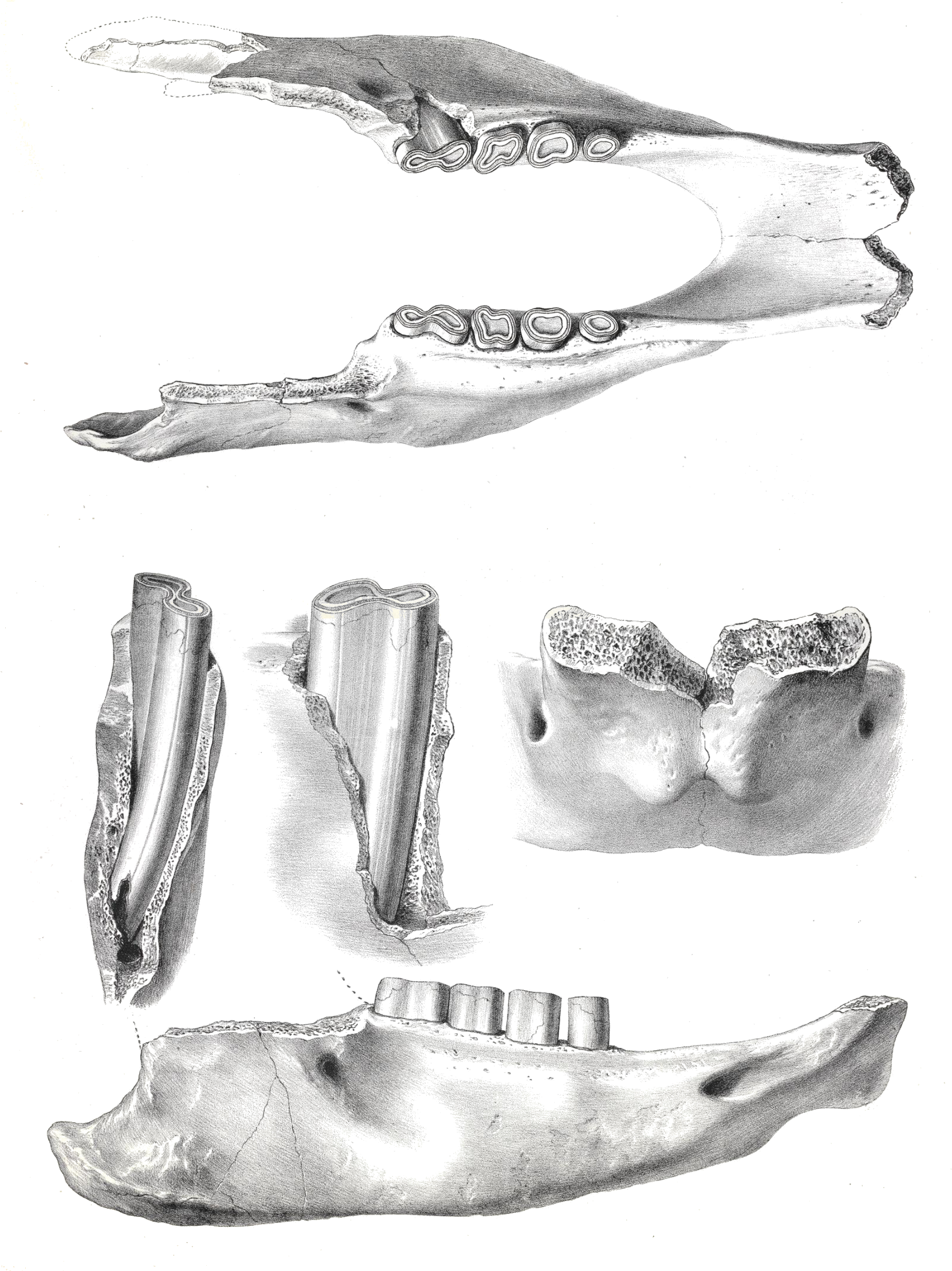
The holotype of Mylodon used by Owen in his initial description

The taxonomic history of Mylodon is complex. It has involved confusion and equivocation with other mylodont forms such as Glossotherium and Paramylodon over a long period of time. Some of this complexity can be attributed to the first describer of the genus itself, who is Richard Owen (1804-1892). Owen, one of the most important explorers of the Victorian era, was concerned from 1836 with fossil finds brought back by Charles Darwin from his pioneering voyage on HMS Beagle to South America. The collection also included a mandible from Punta Alta near Bahía Blanca in the south of the Argentina Buenos Aires Province (specimen number NHM 16617). The nearly complete specimen was distinguished by a row of teeth consisting of a total of four molar-like Teeth. In an extensive 1840 paper, Owen referred the mandible to the new genus he had created, Mylodon, and named the species M. darwinii (darwinii is the spelling used by Owen, but in modern times darwini is also often used; according to the Regulations of Zoological Nomenclature, the former version is correct.) He related the genus name to the molar-like teeth (from Greek μυλη (myle) for "molar" and ὀδούς (odoús) for "tooth", thus translating as much as "molar tooth"), with the species epithet darwinii honoring Darwin as finder of the voucher specimen. As a second species besides M. darwinii Owen referred in his paper to M. harlani. This form was based on a mandible and clavicle, both of which came from the Big Bone Lick in Boone County in the U.S. state of Kentucky, and which Richard Harlan had already described in 1831 under the species assignment Megalonyx laqueatus. Owen, however, recognized similarities in the construction of the mandible to his M. darwinii and renamed Harlan's form. Harlan used an essay two years later to comment on Owen's choice of name regarding Mylodon, which he felt was not very descriptive. According to him, the name could be applied to almost any extinct mammalian form because almost all of them had the posterior molars. Moreover, the name would be inappropriate because, starting from the Latin version dens molaris for "molar tooth" and the second part of speech don (from dens for "tooth"), there is a duplication that would translate as "molar tooth-tooth". Regardless, Owen's establishment of the genus Mylodon with two species resulted in the extinct sloth representative being distributed in both South and North America.

=== Glossotherium, Grypotherium and Paramylodon ===
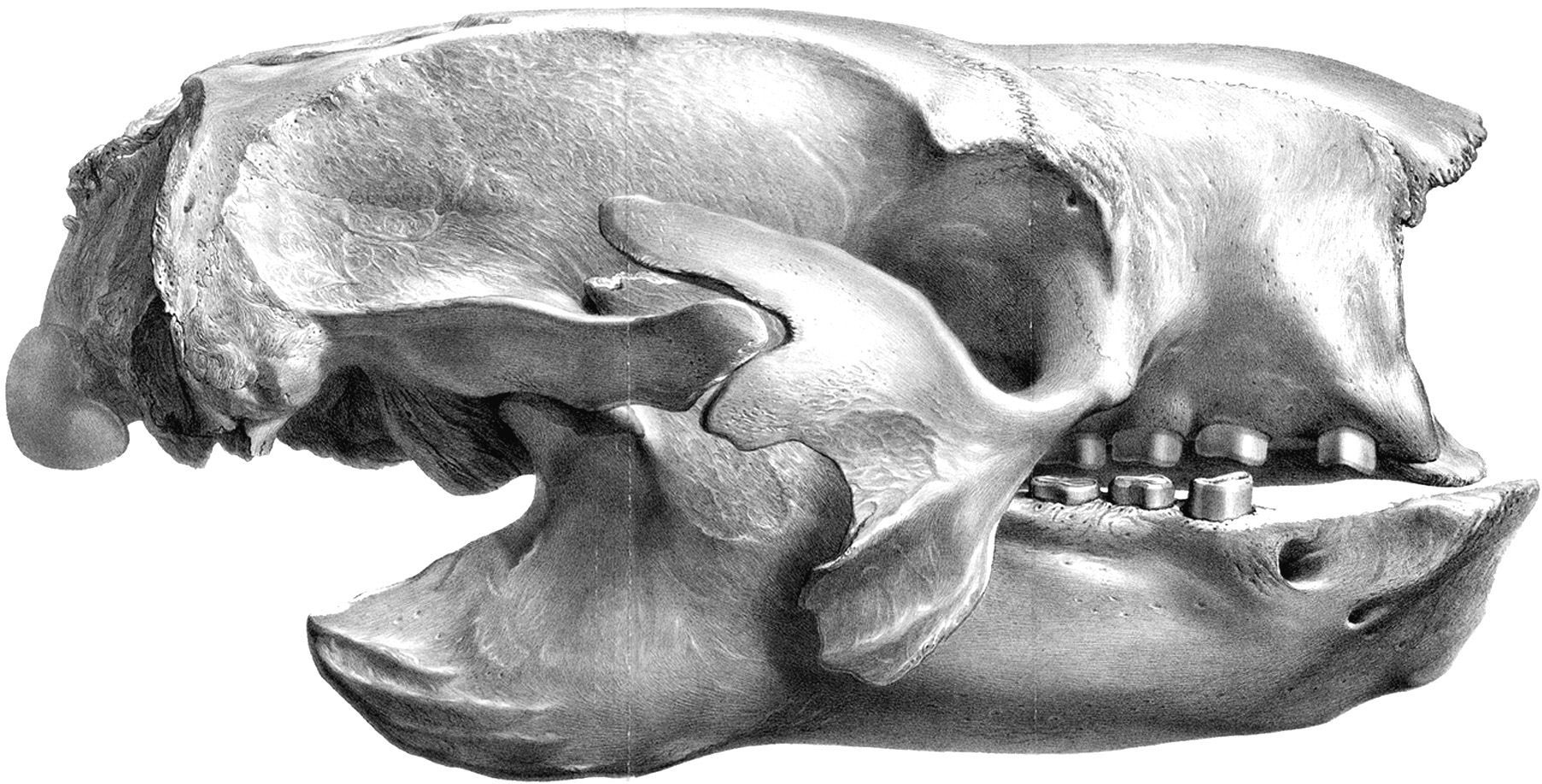
Skull of Glossotherium with typical short and broad snout and open nasal cavity

Owen, in his 1840 work, established the genus Glossotherium in addition to Mylodon, but without designation of a specific species. The basis here was a posterior skull fragment taken from the riverbed of the Arroyo Sarandi in the Uruguay department of Soriano. In contrast to Mylodon, for which Owen assumed a kinship proximity to the other large ground sloths known at the time, such as Megatherium or Megalonyx, he placed Glossotherium in a series with the anteaters and with the pangolins, respectively, and postulated an insectivorous lifestyle for the animals. Two years later, however, Owen discarded the name Glossotherium again. This occurred in the course of processing a nearly complete skeleton that had been discovered the year before in the flood plains of the Río de la Plata north of Buenos Aires. The largely intact skull was characterized by a short and broad snout and by a dentition consisting of a total of 18 teeth, of which the foremost tooth in each case showed a canine design. Based on the similarities in dental structure with the flat, molar-like teeth, Owen placed the skeleton in the genus Mylodon and introduced the new species M. robustus. The skull fragment that he had originally placed in Glossotherium he now associated with M. darwinii. As a result of this study, three species of the genus Mylodon already existed in the 1840s.

A skull including mandible found at Pergamino in Buenos Aires Province served the Danish zoologist Johannes Theodor Reinhardt (1816-1882) in 1879 as the basis for a comprehensive description. Characteristic of the skull was the narrow snout and a closed nasal arch, which was formed by the firm adhesion of the nasal bone to the middle jaw bone. Furthermore, the dentition consisted of a total of 16 teeth, the upper front canine-like tooth was reduced in each case, in the lower jaw, however, sat four molar-like teeth each. Reinhardt noticed similarities to M. darwinii in the construction of the lower jaw, but in the skull design his find deviated clearly from the broad-nosed M. robustus by the narrow snout. However, according to Reinhardt, there were matches in Owen's Glossotherium skull fragment with corresponding skull sections in M. robustus. Based on the clear parallels between M. darwinii and his narrow-beaked skull finding, Reinhardt propagated the new genus Grypotherium with Grypotherium darwinii as the type species. A different approach was taken by Florentino Ameghino (1854-1911) about ten years later. He confirmed in 1889, the separation of both M. darwinii and M. robustus not only at the species level, but also at the genus level. Deviating from Reinhardt, but agreeing with Owen, he considered the mandible of M. darwinii and the skull fragment of Glossotherium to belong together. Since in this scenario Glossotherium possessed priority over Mylodon (Owen mentioned the former over the latter in 1840) and Grypotherium, Ameghino introduced the species Glossotherium darwinii. In contrast, he left the status of M. robustus untouched. Arthur Smith Woodward (1864-1944), in turn, followed Reinhardt's reasoning. In a paper published in 1900, he presented findings from ground sloths of southern Patagonia and at the same time revised Charles Darwin's collection. In doing so, he equated the mandible of M. darwinii with Reinhardt's Grypotherium and subsequently recovered Grypotherium darwinii. Smith Woodward assigned the skull fragment of Glossotherium to M. robustus by analogy with Reinhardt.

== Paleobiology ==
=== Diet ===
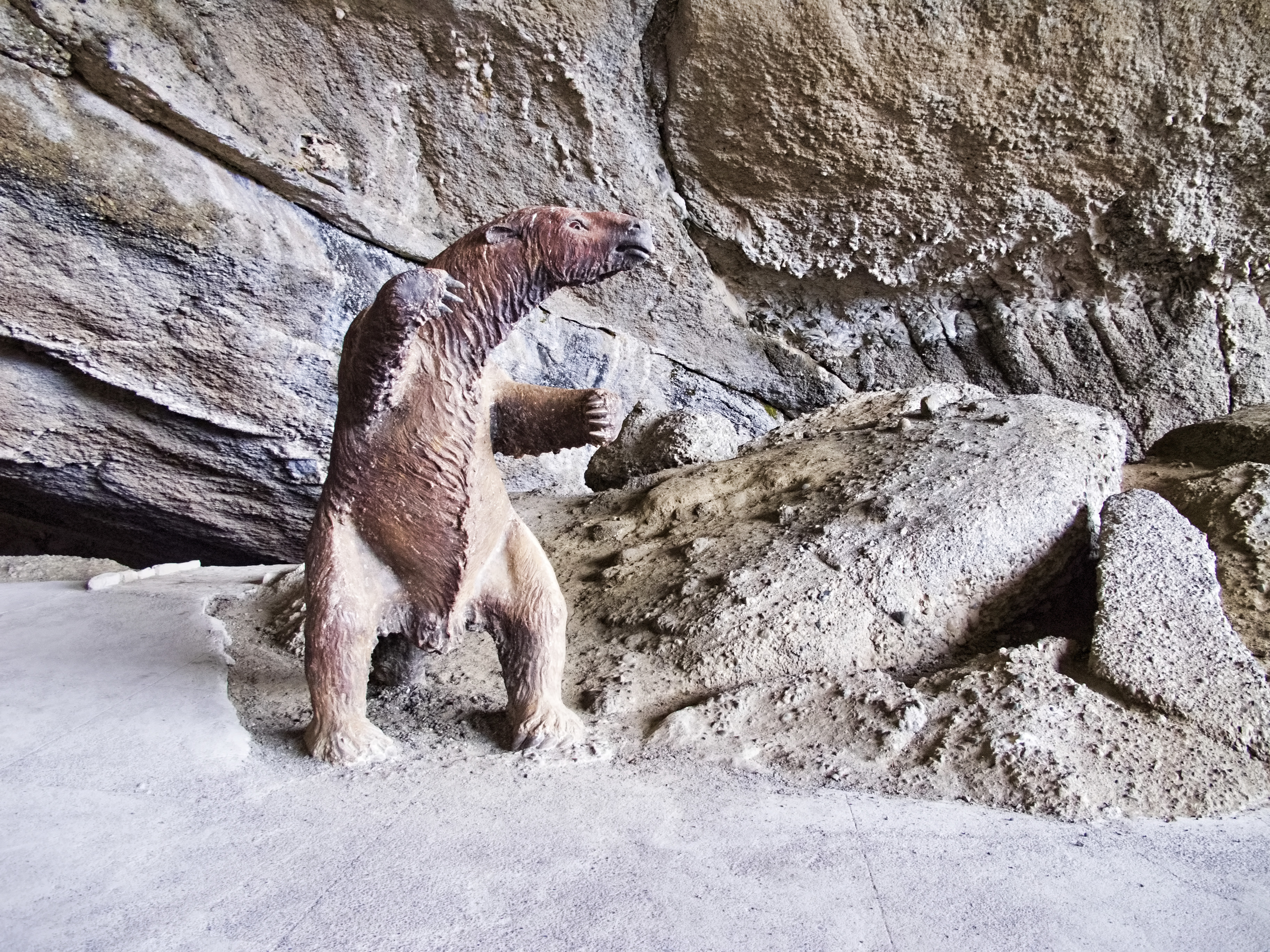
Model in Cueva del Milodón Natural Monument where fossils were found in 1896

The mylodontids (particularly Mylodon itself) are often considered to be pronounced grazers because of their dental structure with flat chewing surfaces on the molar-like teeth. This is also supported by the high (hypsodont) tooth crowns and the wide mouth with numerous shapes. The ungulates are mostly used as analogous examples, in which shapes with high tooth crowns and broad-lipped mouths are usually grass-eating, such as various cattle, horses or the white rhinoceros. In contrast, those with low tooth crowns and narrow snouts such as the duiker or the black rhinoceros feed largely selective from various leaves and other soft vegetable foods. In contrast to other large mylodontid sloths such as Glossotherium, Paramylodon or Lestodon, the mouth of Mylodon is relatively narrow. A special feature is the closed nasal arch, which is heavily roughened in its front area and thus offers muscle attachment points for a mobile upper lip. Something similar can be said about individual depressions in the vicinity of the infraorbital foramen, which also functioned as starting points for individual muscle strands in the nose and lip area. Maybe Mylodon was more well-adapted to a mixed-vegetation diet, which was picked up with the help of a movable upper lip. The loss of the front teeth in the upper row of teeth also leads to the assumption that, comparable to cattle, there was a horn-like structure on the middle jawbone that could be used to pluck the food.

The entire anterior cranial structure of Mylodon is relatively solid, combined with a partially ossified nasal septum, it can be assumed that relatively high chewing forces acted when the food was chopped up. In contrast to the sometimes huge representatives of the Megatheriidae, the joint between the lower jaw and the skull of the Mylodonts was relatively low, roughly at the chewing level of the teeth. The resulting decreasing lever arm of the masseter muscle experiences through the structure of the zygomatic arch, mainly of the descending process, a certain compensation, so that there should have been only minor differences to the Megatheria with regard to the biting force. The extended mandibular joint allows a wide freedom of movement when chewing. Against this, however, is the zygomatic arch, which is not closed and therefore could only withstand the opposing forces of the masseter and musculus pterygoideus to a limited extent. It can therefore be assumed that forwards and backwards directed chewing movements dominated in Mylodon. The flat tooth crowns lead to a comparatively small size of the total available chewing surface. In Mylodon, this amounts to a good 1320 mm^{2} corresponding to other mylodonts of the same size. The Indian rhinoceros, which is comparable in terms of its dimensions, has, on the other hand, double to four times the value with 2660 to 5190 mm^{2}. The situation is similar with the hippopotamus, the total surface area of which is between 3290 and 5410 mm^{2}. The small total occlusal surface of the teeth in Mylodon probably resulted in a rather low processing capacity for the food in the mouth. This can result in either a high rate of fermentation in the gastrointestinal tract and/or a very slow metabolism concluded. The latter is the case with today's sloths. This is due to the long passage time of the food of up to a week through the large, multi-chambered stomach. It can be assumed that this also applies to the extinct sloths. Possibly this made the stomach of the mylodonts a functional equivalent to the complex stomach of the ruminants, whereby a long passage time of the food enabled efficient digestion, in which even more difficult to access nutrients could be provided, for example from foods with a greater fiber content. Such a digestive system could reduce the amount of processed food in the mouth and thus ultimately also have compensated for the small total chewing surface in Mylodon.

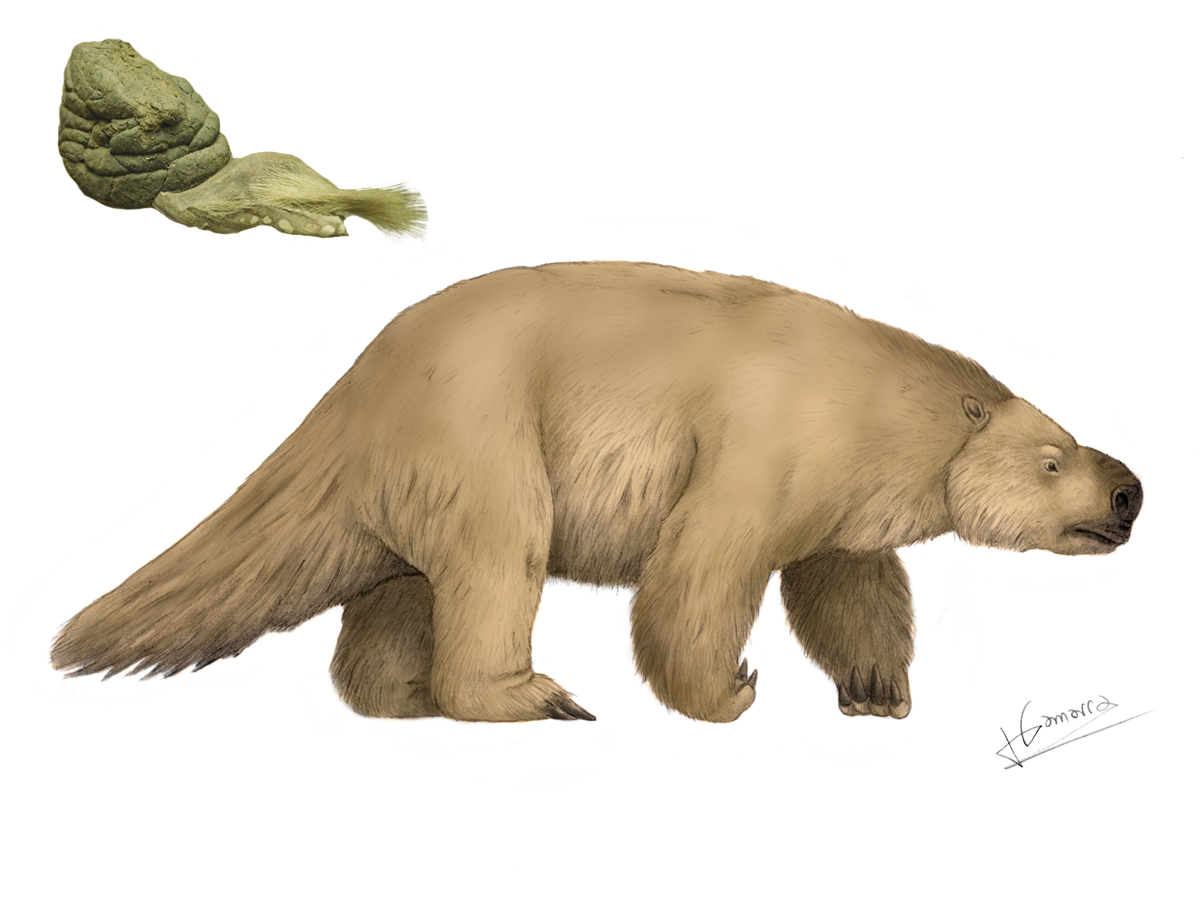
Restoration of Mylodon darwini with an excrement and skin fragment.

Direct analysis of the food resources used is possible, among many other things, due to the numerous dung residues in the form of coprolites. These are available not only from the Cueva del Milodón in the Chilean part of Patagonia, but also from other caves. The coprolites of Mylodon have a diameter of up to 18 cm. Investigations of the plant residues showed 80 to 95% grasses and 5 to 20% sedges. Herbaceous plants, on the other hand, could only be detected in traces. Accordingly, Mylodon led, at least in southwestern Patagonia, a diet consisting almost exclusively of grasses. The food is reflected in the paleohabitat, as pollen analyzes show that the landscape at that time was tundra-like in character and was therefore almost free of trees with only a few low bushes. Occasional evidence of false beeches is interpreted as pollen carried by the wind.

A 2021 study on stable isotope ratios concluded that Mylodon must have been at least sporadically omnivorous.

=== Locomotion ===
In general, large mylodonts are ground-dwelling animals. The lower section of the hind leg, which is very short compared to the upper, is also found in Mylodon, whose tibia is 27 cm in length and only half as long as the thigh bone, 59 cm in length. In comparison, the Megatheriidae possess significantly longer lower leg portions, about the almost equally-proportioned Pyramiodontherium possessing to a 47 cm long shin to a 49 cm long femur. Possibly these differences in the hind leg structure result in much more agile locomotion in the Megatheria in relation to the mylodonts. Similar to other large ground sloths, the hand of Mylodon made contact with the ground with the outer side edge and thus sat up rotated. This is indicated by the long metacarpal bones of the external digits and the decreasing number of phalanges on them. The special hand position protected the long claws of the inner digits, which did not penetrate the ground while walking. A functionally similar but fundamentally different hand position can be found in the ankle duct of the distantly related present-day great anteater. The elbow joint was pointed slightly outwards when standing on four feet and the arms were thus angled slightly inwards, which is evident from the position of the olecranon yields. The hands came to rest slightly within the width of the elbow. Such an orientation of the arms can effectively support the large mass of Mylodon. As a result, the hands would also be in a line with the feet, which is also conveyed, among other things, by footprints from Paramylodon. The laterally limited articular surface of the femoral head severely restricted the mobility of the hindlimbs. The same applies to the forearm, the straight spoke with the laterally elongated head of which did not allow any major rotational movements. These features can be interpreted as adaptations to a purely terrestrial lifestyle. Finally, the muscle attachment points on the first cervical vertebra referenced, which are more developed than for example with Paramylodon. Correspondingly, the occipital joint surfaces are also somewhat further apart. Both can be interpreted as meaning that the more massive skull of Mylodon, caused by the lengthening of the snout region, required greater muscle support.

For some of the mylodonts of South America, such as Glossotherium, a partially burrowing way of life is being reconstructed, which results from the construction of the foreleg, among other things. An indicator for this is the upper articular process (olecranon) of the ulna. The longer the olecranon, the higher the leverage of the forearm, since more attachment surface is available for the forearm muscles. In Glossotherium, the olecranon takes up up to 35% of the total length of the ulna. The resulting ability to dig would be comparable to that of the Tolypeutes armadillos, which seldom build their own burrows, but can do so. The previous analyses for Mylodon resulted in a much shorter olecranon, which accounts for only about 22% of the total length of the ulna. However, the fact that proportional estimates for Mylodon refer to a not fully grown specimen is problematic. Other clues can be derived from the construction of the hand. In Mylodon, for example, the metacarpal bones of the second and third ray are very delicate, in contrast to Glossotherium. A weakly pronounced central ray does not seem to support a digging activity, as this is usually most strongly developed in underground mammals. However, the distal articular facet of the third metacarpal bone is flat, which means that the middle finger is generally stiff and stable. The same articulation surface on the second metacarpal is significantly more rounded and thus supports greater mobility of the finger when gripping. This obviously resulted in functional differences between the individual rays of the hand. The rare signs of wear and tear on the last phalanx, which are isolated from the Cueva del Milodón several times, can serve as an additional indicator of digging activities.

=== Predation and Parasites ===
Especially in southern and southwestern Patagonia, numerous bone changes in finds of Mylodon can be proven to be caused by predatory animals. This includes, above all, the remains from the Cueva del Milodón in southwestern Chile. Some caves in their immediate vicinity, such as Cueva Lago Sofía 4 and Cueva Chica, are interpreted as clumps of predators. The same applies to the Cueva del Puma or the Cueva Fell in the Pali-Aike area of southern Chile. Some of the caves mainly contain smaller skeletal elements such as hand and foot bones or bone plates, which indicate that only part of the carcass was carried into the shelter. Whether this is the result of direct foraging or scavenging cannot be determined in many cases. Other caves, in turn, contained a larger proportion of young Mylodon animals. The largest predators occurring at that time are the puma and the jaguar, as well as the saber-toothed cat Smilodon populator and the extinct bear Arctotherium. The latter two could have reconstructed body weights of over 400 kg, with prey sizes between 1 and 2 t being assumed for the saber-toothed cat, which makes Smilodon a likely predator of Mylodon.

In various coprolites produced by Mylodon, eggs of nematodes are preserved. The eggs are ovaloid in shape with lengths of almost 50 μm in length and 29 μm in thickness. In addition, individual beetles could be detected.

== Extinction ==
Mylodon became extinct 12-10,000 years ago at the end of the Pleistocene as part of the Late Pleistocene megafauna extinctions, along with all other mainland ground sloths and most large animals in the Americas. The timing coincides with the arrival of humans in the Americas, as well as climatic change. There is evidence that humans exploited Mylodon for food. At Fell's cave (Cueva Fell) in Chilean Patagonia, fractured and burned bones of Mylodon darwinii have been found in association with human artefacts, dating to around 12,766–12,354 calendar years Before Present (BP). At Piedra Museo in Argentine Patagonia, bones of Mylodon are found in association with human artefacts, dating to around 15,517–12,352 cal yr BP. This exploitation may have been a factor in its extinction.

== Folklore and alleged survival ==
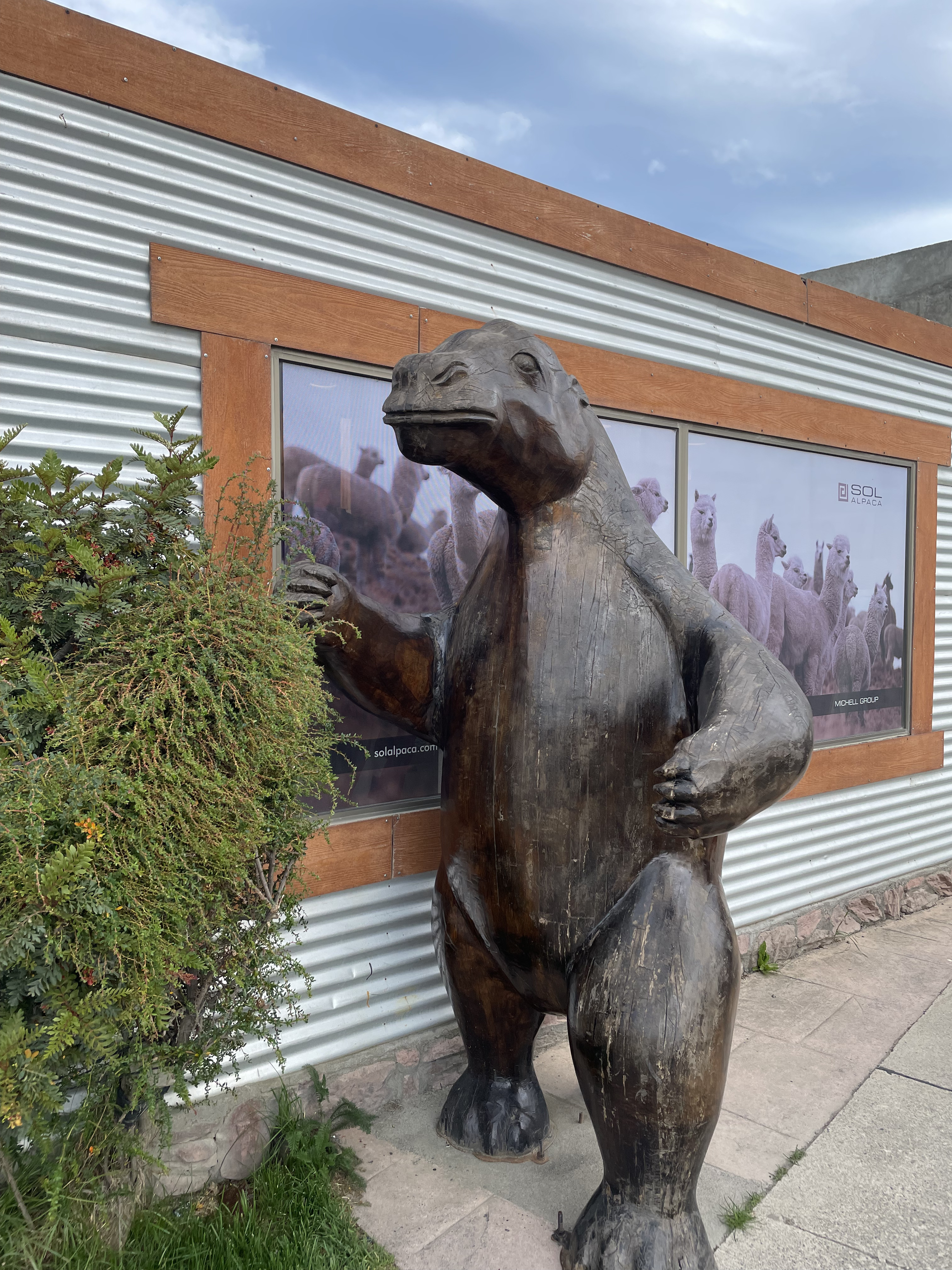
Statue of a Mylodon in Puerto Natales

The discovery of remarkably preserved Mylodon remains in 1895 at the Cueva del Milodón in Chilean Patagonia sparked widespread speculation about the animal's potential survival. The recovery of mummified skin patches, still featuring fur and dermal ossicles, led some early researchers to believe the species had only recently become extinct or might still inhabit remote Andean valleys.

In 1900, H. Hesketh Prichard led a Patagonia expedition financed by C. Arthur Pearson (Daily Express) to investigate reports and rumours of a surviving "Mylodon", but reported no convincing evidence of survival.

Subsequent radiocarbon dating programs indicate that the Cueva del Milodón mylodontid remains are Late Pleistocene in age, despite their fresh appearance under cave preservation conditions.
