= Physaloptera hispida =

Scientific classification
- Kingdom: Animalia
- Phylum: Nematoda
- Class: Chromadorea
- Order: Rhabditida
- Family: Physalopteridae
- Genus: Physaloptera
- Species: P. hispida

Binomial name
- Physaloptera hispida Schell, 1952 (Note: Kinsella, 1988, table 1. Kinsella (1974, p. 9) gives 1950.)

Species of roundworm

Physaloptera hispida is a parasitic nematode in the genus Physaloptera. It has been found on the marsh rice rat (Oryzomys palustris), hispid cotton rat (Sigmodon hispidus), Florida mouse (Podomys floridanus), cotton mouse (Peromyscus gossypinus), and oldfield mouse (Peromyscus polionotus) in Florida.

== See also ==
- List of parasites of the marsh rice rat

== Literature cited ==
- Kinsella, J.M. 1974. Comparison of helminth parasites of the cotton rat, Sigmodon hispidus, from several habitats in Florida. American Museum Novitates 2540:1–12.
- Kinsella, J.M. 1988. Comparison of helminths of rice rats, Oryzomys palustris, from freshwater and saltwater marshes in Florida. Proceedings of the Helminthological Society of Washington 55(2):275–280.
- Kinsella, J.M. 1991. Comparison of helminths of three species of mice, Podomys floridanus, Peromyscus gossypinus, and Peromyscus polionotus, from southern Florida. Canadian Journal of Zoology 39:3078–3083.
