= Gregarinicae =

Scientific classification
- Domain: Eukaryota
- Clade: Sar
- Superphylum: Alveolata
- Phylum: Apicomplexa
- Class: Conoidasida
- Order: Eugregarinorida
- Suborder: Septatorina
- Superfamily: Gregarinicae

Families
- Cephaloidophoridae; Cephalolobidae; Didymophyidae; Gregarinidae; Hirmocystidae; Metameridae; Uradiophoridae

Superfamily of single-celled organisms

Gregarinicae is a superfamily of parasitic alveolates of the phylum Apicomplexa.

== Taxonomy ==
There are seven families in this taxon.

== History ==
This superfamily was created by Chakaravarty in 1960.

== Description ==
Species in superfamily infect only a single host during their life cycle.

Species in this genus associate with one another prior to syzygy.

=== Differential diagnosis ===
This superfamily is distinguished from Porosporidae by having a monogenic (one host) life cycle. In this family sporogony is completed in the gametocyst.

The species in this superfamily are distinguished from Stenophoricae, members of which remain solitary until mature. These latter species typically forming associations only at the onset of syzygy.
