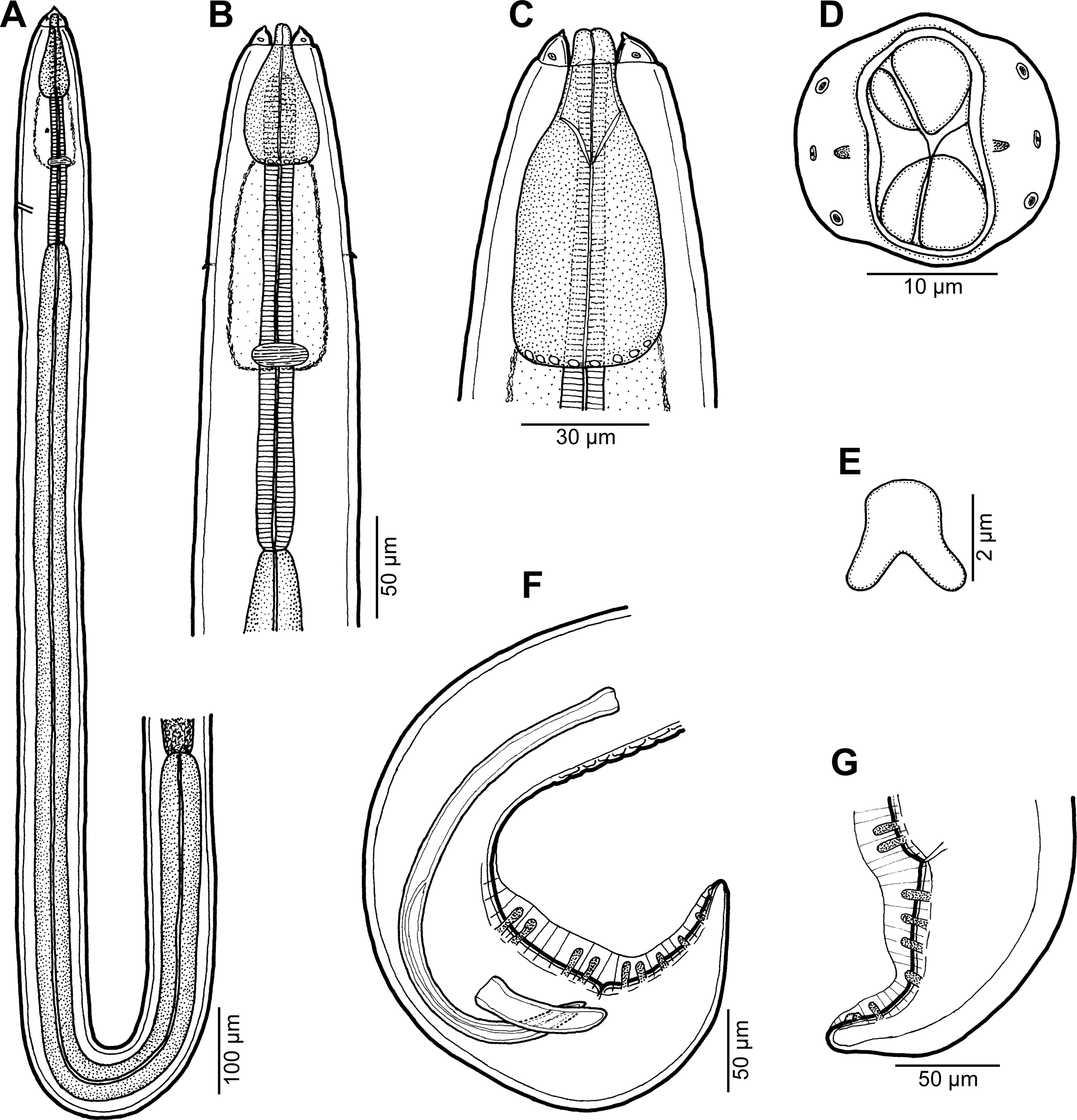
- Rasheedia novaecaledoniensis

Scientific classification
- Kingdom: Animalia
- Phylum: Nematoda
- Class: Chromadorea
- Order: Rhabditida
- Family: Physalopteridae
- Genus: Rasheedia
- Species: R. novaecaledoniensis

Binomial name
- Rasheedia novaecaledoniensis Moravec & Justine, 2018

= Rasheedia novaecaledoniensis =

Species of roundworm

Rasheedia novaecaledoniensis is a parasitic nematode in the genus Rasheedia.

The species is an intestinal parasite of the Indian goatfish Parupeneus indicus (Mullidae) off New Caledonia.The two species Rasheedia novaecaledoniensis and Rasheedia heptacanthi, which both occur in New Caledonian waters, are mainly differentiated by the number of anterior protrusible oesophageal lobes (two in R. heptacanthi and four in R. novaecaledoniensis), structure of the oesophagus and the lengths of their spicules.
