= Stenophoricae =

Scientific classification
- Domain: Eukaryota
- Clade: Sar
- Superphylum: Alveolata
- Phylum: Apicomplexa
- Class: Conoidasida
- Order: Eugregarinorida
- Suborder: Septatorina
- Superfamily: Stenophoricae

Families
- Acutidae; Amphiplatysporidae; Brustiophoridae; Cnemidosporidae; Dactylophoridae; Leidyanidae; Monoductidae; Monoicidae; Sphaerocystidae; Stenophoridae; Trichorhynchidae

Superfamily of single-celled organisms

Stenophoricae is a superfamily of parasites of the phylum Apicomplexa.

== Taxonomy ==
There are eleven families in this taxon.

== History ==
This superfamily was created by Levine in 1984. Its description was emended by Clopton in 2009.

It was previously designated Solitaricae by Chakravarty in 1960.

== Description ==
Species in this superfamily infect only a single host during their life cycle.

The trophozoites are solitary and may develop either intracellularly or extracellularly.

The epimerite varies in its structure between species.

The gametocysts may or may not have sporoducts. They have a hyaline epicyst.

Oocysts are released in a variety of ways depending on the species:

- Dehiscence of the gametocyst and release of single oocysts en masse
- Release of oocysts in polyete chains from the gametocyst
- Rupture of a gametocyst valve and release of oocysts in monete chains
- Expulsion of isolated oocysts en masse

=== Differential diagnosis ===
This superfamily is distinguished by the Porosporidae by only having one host in the life cycle.

It is distinguished from the Gregarinicae by the lack of formation of association between the parasites before gametocyst formation. Members of the Gregarinicae typically form associations before they mature. This occurs some time before the onset of syzygy.
