= Actinocephalidae =

Scientific classification
- Domain: Eukaryota
- Clade: Sar
- Clade: Alveolata
- Phylum: Apicomplexa
- Class: Conoidasida
- Order: Eugregarinorida
- Suborder: Septatorina
- Superfamily: Stylocephaloidea
- Family: Actinocephalidae; Léger, 1892

Genera
- Actinocephalus; Asterophora; Acanthoepimeritus; Agrippina; Alaspora; Amphoroides; Amphorocephalus; Anthorhynchus; Ascocephalus; Bothriopsides; Caulocephalus; Chilogregarina; Coleorhynchus; Cornimeritus; Crucocephalus; Discorhyncus; Epicavus; Gemmicephalus; Geneiorhynchus; Globulocephalus; Gryllotalpia; Harendraia; Legeria; Levinea; Phialoides; Pilidiophora; Pomania; Pyxinia; Pileocephalus; Sciadiophora; Steinina; Stictospora; Stylocystis; Taeniocystis; Tricystis; Thalicola; Umbracephalus; Urnaepimeritus

Family of single-celled organisms

Actinocephalidae is a family of parasitic alveolates of the phylum Apicomplexa

== Taxonomy ==
Thirty eight genera are recognised in this family.

== History ==
This taxon was described by Leger in 1892.

== Description ==
Species in this taxon infect insects.
