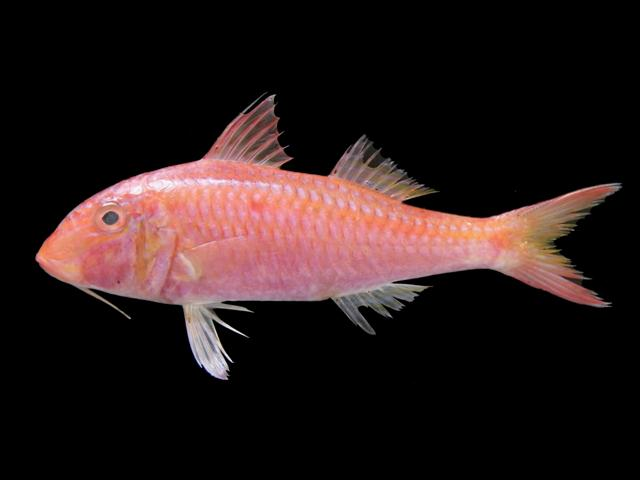

Conservation status
- Least Concern (IUCN 3.1)

Scientific classification
- Kingdom: Animalia
- Phylum: Chordata
- Class: Actinopterygii
- Division: Teleostei
- Order: Syngnathiformes
- Family: Mullidae
- Genus: Parupeneus
- Species: P. heptacanthus

Binomial name
- Parupeneus heptacanthus (Lacépède, 1802)

Synonyms
- Sciaena heptacantha Lacepède, 1802; Pseudupeneus heptacanthus (Lacepède, 1802); Upeneus heptacanthus (Lacepède, 1802); Upeneus cinnabarinus Cuvier, 1829; Parupeneus cinnabarinus (Cuvier, 1829); Upeneus pleurospilos Bleeker, 1853; Parupeneus pleurospilos (Bleeker, 1853); Pseudupeneus pleurospilos (Bleeker, 1853); Pseudupeneus xanthopurpureusFourmanoir, 1957

= Parupeneus heptacanthus =

Species of ray-finned fish

Parupeneus heptacanthus, commonly known as cinnabar goatfish, and sold in UK as "Red Mullet", is a goatfish native to the western Pacific and Indian oceans.

== Parasites ==
As in other fish, the cinnabar goatfish has many parasites, including the physalopterid nematode Rasheedia heptacanthi, a parasite of its digestive system.
