= Nematopsis =

Scientific classification
- Domain: Eukaryota
- (unranked): SAR
- (unranked): Alveolata
- Phylum: Apicomplexa
- Class: Conoidasida
- Order: Eugregarinorida
- Family: Porosporidae
- Genus: Nematopsis Schneider, 1892

Genus of single-celled organisms

Nematopsis is a genus of gregarine apicomplexans of the family Porosporidae. It is an aquatic parasite of crustaceans with a molluscan intermediate host. Nematopsis has been distinguished from the similar genus Porospora by its resistant and encapsulated oocyst. Little molecular biology has been performed on the members of the Nemaptosis and species are described based on molluscan and crustacean hosts as well as oocyst structure. A total of 38 species have been described and are found all over the world (United States, India, Brazil, Spain, Thailand and other coastal regions)

== Etymology ==
The genus name Nematopsis is derived from the worm resembling sporozoite. Nematopsis: “resembling a nematode”.

== History of knowledge ==
Nematopsis was first described by A. Schneider in France in 1892. Due to N. portunidarum’s (previously known as N. schneideri) ovoid oocysts, Schneider initially assigned the species to the Coccidia. However, in 1903 Leger found similar spores in mussels and proposed the name Nematopsis schneider. These spores germinated into vermiform sporozoites resembling small nematode worms, hence the name Nematopsis. In 1911 Leger and Dubosq proposed the new name Porospora portunidarum after the same spores hatched in the crab Portunus and developed into a gregarine. However in 1931 Hatt changed the classification back to Nematopsis after observing its resistant monozoic spores; he renamed it Nematopsis portunidarum. After Nematopsis’ initial discovery in 1892, Schneider also named another genus, Porospora, in 1875. These two genera make up the family Porosporidae Labbe 1899. For many years following the discovery of these two genera, their taxonomic differences were unclear and confusing. Their taxonomic differences became clear with the description of their sporozoite morphologies. Members of the genus Porospora have naked sporozoites, enclosed by the hosts cell, whereas species of the genus Nematopsis have sporozoites enclosed in thick hyaline walls. The Nematopsis spores were found to occur in mollusc tissue.

The life cycle of Nematopsis was described by H. Prytherch in 1938 and again in more detail in 1940. This description was used as criteria on which to assign species to the genus. Most species were described after 1938.

In 1938, Ball described the genus Carcinoecetes, a parasite of crabs which was initially thought to be related to the family Prosporidae. However, members of Carcinoecetes are now accepted as belonging to either Nematopsis or Cephaloidophora. Three previously described Carcinoecetes species are now considered Nematopsis: N. calappae, N. Hesperus and N. matutae.

== Habitat and ecology ==
Nematopsis is a marine parasite which utilizes marine bivalves as intermediate hosts. They have been found all over the world; including United States, India, Thailand, Spain, Brazil and other coastal regions. Different species of Nematopsis have preferences for different host species and tissue type. The primary host of Nematopsis are the mud and stone crabs. The degree to which Nematopsis parasitism damages its host is dependent on the severity of infection. Histological examination of Indian oysters, Crassostrea madasensis, demonstrated hypertrophy of infected cells, leading to mechanical interference of physiological processes such as feeding and gas exchange. However, infected hosts did not mount immune responses to Nematopsis infection. The study also suggests that at a low levels of infection the host's would not be damaged by the parasitism. One study from Brazil found that 100% of cultivated oysters, Crassostrea rhizopjorae, were infected by Nematopsis sp.. The study suggested that infection led to lesions and tissue destruction in the oysters. How Nematopsis can infect molluscan populations through intra- and interspecific spread is unknown. Once Nematopsis moves to its secondary crustacean host, its effect is relatively understudied. Nematopsis infection in molluscs has been found to have seasonality and temperature dependence. Gutierrez- Salazar et al. (2011) suggest that Nematopsis sp. was most prevalent in morning and evening temperatures. Due to the endo-parasitic nature of Nematopsis other factors such as water quality and presence of bacteria did not influence its abundance.

== Description ==
=== Morphology and anatomy ===
In general, adult extracellular Nematopsis (sporadins) are milky-white in color, and associate as groups of two caudo-frontally, with one cell's anterior side contacting the other's posterior. The two cells are associated linearly and range from around 150-200 μm in length. Nuclei are generally spherical to ovoid and each associated cell possesses a single nucleus. Apicomplexan parasites such as Nematopsis have specialized organelles called rhoptries. These are unique secretory organelles that store phospholipids and cholesterol and are used for rapid mitotic events needed for dispersal of infectious cells.

The gametocyst of Nematopsis, the cyst in which gametes are produced in gregarines, is spherical and around 110-160 μm in diameter. They are generally found in close contact with host tissue (gastro-intestinal tract, gills or mantle). The surface of the gametocyst is wrinkled and has a central pore at one pole. Inside the gametocytes are many gymnospores and membranous sacs. The gymnospores are composed of many radially arranged, cone-shaped sporozoites, the infective agent that infects a target host. At the sporozoite rostral end there is an oval nucleus, rough endoplasmic reticulum, mitochondria and secretory granules.

The oocyst of Nematopsis contains a single uni-nucleated vermiform sporozoite. It is ellipsoidal in shape and found along myofibrils of host tissue. The oocysts is encapsulate in a thick hyaline wall. The oocyst is resistant to destruction within the host due to its thick protective wall.

=== Life cycle ===
==== Crustacean host ====
Nematopsis undergoes growth, gametogenesis, sexual recombination, and zygote formation in its crustacean host (i.e. crab) and produces gymnospores that go on to infect molluscan hosts. The crustacean becomes infected after ingesting an oocyst. Once ingested sporozoites migrate to the intestine, attach to epithelial cells and grow, growth to maturity takes around 14–21 days. Mature cells then associate to form sporadins and migrate to the crustacean's rectum, where they reproduce and form gametocysts. Zygotes divide to form sporozoites within the gametocysts, forming the gymnospores, the gametocyst ruptures and releases gymnospores through the crabs anus into the surrounding water.

==== Intermediate molluscan host ====
Once feeding currents cause Nematopsis to enter its molluscan host, gymnospores first attach to the mollusc's gill or mantle depending on the species and penetrate the epithelium. They are then engulfed by the host's leukocytes and undergo presporonic growth. Once mature each sporozoite forms a resistant oocyst, which can be ingested by a crustacean host. Some Nematopsis species may from “heliospores” (bundles of female and male gametes) which are then transmitted to molluscs and form naked zygotes.

=== Genetics ===
Little genetic material of Nematopsis has been sequences. Ribosomal RNA of Nematopsis temporariae was sequenced to show its parasitic relationship to tadpoles.

== Practical importance ==
As Nematopsis infects molluscs and crustaceans, it has strong effects on aquaculture. Recent studies have been conducted to investigate the role of Nematopsis as a parasite in commercially valuable marine organisms, in particular bivalves and crustaceans. Gregarine disease of penaeid shrimp is a common disease caused by Nematopsis spp. that affects shrimp in the United States, France, and India. Due to parasite attachment in the crustaceans gut lumen, reduced absorption of food and intestinal blockages can occur in the host. Although this has been thought to have little pathological significance for the host, severe infections can lead to low host survival and decreased shrimp output from the cultivation facility. Similarly to crustacean, molluscs with severe Nematopsis infections can develop lesions and hypertrophy which can lead to mechanical deformations inhibiting feeding and gas exchange, again resulting in poor quality shellfish and lower yields. Although Nematopsis infection may not always be severe, it is clear that it can affect aquaculture practice of both wild and cultured organisms and it is important to understand what influences the occurrence of Nematopsis infection and its severity. Better understanding of Nematopsis infection in commercially valuable species will lead to better management programs and optimization of quality and quantity of the desired aquaculture product.

== Species list ==
Species are classified based on their host and oocyst morphology, little molecular data exists on the genus.

Species	Author
Nv penaeus	Sprague (1954)
Nematopsis duorari	Kruse (1966)
Nematopsis brasiliensis	Feigenbaum (1975)
Nematopsis sinaloensis	Feigenbaum (1975)
Nematopsis vannamei	Feigenbaum (1975)
Nematopsis indicus	Prema & Janardaman (1990)
Nematopsis marinus	
Nematopsis legeri	Leger (1905)
Nematopsis veneris	
Nematopsis pectinis	
Nematopsis ostrearum	
Nematopsis prytherchi	
Nematopsis duorari	Kruse (1966)
Nematopsis calappae	Ball (1951)
Nematopsis dorippe	Bogolepova (1953)
Nematopsis maraisi	
Nematopsis mizoulei	Theodorides (1964)
Nematopsis panopei	Ball (1951)
Nematopsis parapeneopsis	Setna & Bhatia (1934)
Nematopsis portunidarum	Frenzel (1885)
Nematopsis prytherchi	Sprague (1949)
Nematopsis raouadi	Vivares (1970)
Nematopsis soyeri	Theodorides (1965)
Nematopsis quadratum	
Nematopsis rosenbergii	Shanavas & Prasadan (1989)
Nematopsis sinaloensis	Feigenbaum (1975)
Nematopsis theodoria	Theodorides (1965)
Nematopsis tuzetae	Vivares (1972)
Nematopsis annulipes	
Nematopsis clausii	Frenzel (1885)
Nematopsis foresti	Theodorides (1967)
Nematopsis gigas	Azevedo & Padovan (2004)
Nematopsis goneplaxi	Tuzet & Ormieres (1961)
Nematopsis grassei	Theodroides (1962)
Nematopsis hesperus	Ball (1983)
Nematopsis matutae	Ball (1959)
Nematopsis messor	
Nematopsis petiti	Theodoride (1962)
