= Blabericolidae =

Scientific classification
- Domain: Eukaryota
- Clade: Sar
- Superphylum: Alveolata
- Phylum: Apicomplexa
- Class: Conoidasida
- Order: Eugregarinorida
- Suborder: Septatorina
- Genus: Blabericolidae; Clopton, 2009

Genera
- Blabericola; Protomagalhaensia

Family of single-celled organisms

Blabericolidae is a family of parasitic alveolates in the phylum Apicomplexa.

== Taxonomy ==
There are two genera in this family: Blabericola and Protomagalhaensia. Each genus has five recognised species.

== History ==
This family was described by Clopton in 2009.

== Description ==
Species in the family infect cockroaches.

The type genus is Blabericola, and the type species is Blabericola migrator. The type host is the Madagascar hissing cockroach (Gromphadorhina portentosa).
