= Fusiona =

Scientific classification
- Domain: Eukaryota
- (unranked): SAR
- (unranked): Alveolata
- Phylum: Apicomplexa
- Class: Conoidasida
- Order: Eugregarinorida
- Family: Fusionidae
- Genus: Fusiona

Species
- Fusiona geusi

Genus of single-celled organisms

Fusiona is a genus of the family Fusionidae in the phylum Apicomplexa

== Taxonomy ==
There is one species - Fusiona geusi - in this genus. This species infects bees.

== History ==
This genus was created in 1965 by Stejskal.

== Description ==
Species in this family are homoxenous.

Gametocytes - not described

Spores - not described

Both gamonts and trophozoites are septate. The gamonts are morphologically different (anisogamous).

Sexual reproduction involves a cephalocaudal association. During syzygy, the nucleus and enterocyte of the satellite move to the primite where they fuse.
