= Cephaloidophoridae =

Scientific classification
- Domain: Eukaryota
- Supergroup: Alveolata
- Phylum: Apicomplexa
- Class: Conoidasida
- Order: Eugregarinorida
- Superfamily: Gregarinicae
- Family: Cephaloidophoridae

Genera
- Caridohabitans; Cephaloidophora; Rotundula

Family of single-celled organisms

Cephaloidophoridae is a family of parasitic alveolates of the phylum Apicomplexa

== Taxonomy ==
There are three genera in this taxon and seventy named species.

== History ==
This taxon was created by Kamm in 1922.

== Description ==
Species in this family infect crustaceans and infect only a single host during their life cycle.

They are spread by the orofaecal route and infect the intestine of the host.

Their early development is within the cells of the intestine. Once mature they rupture the cell and escape into the intestinal lumen.

The primite is distinguishable from satellite.

The parasites associate with one another prior to syzygy in a head to tail (caudofrontal) fashion.

There is marked anisogamy.

The gametocysts open by simple rupture;

The oocysts are ovoid or spherical in shape. There is a protruding equatorial ridge but there is no distinct epispore;
