= Stylocephaloidea =

Scientific classification
- Domain: Eukaryota
- Clade: Sar
- Superphylum: Alveolata
- Phylum: Apicomplexa
- Class: Conoidasida
- Order: Eugregarinorida
- Suborder: Septatorina
- Superfamily: Stylocephaloidea

Families
- Actinocephalidae; Stylocephalidae

Superfamily of single-celled organisms

Stylocephaloidea is a superfamily of parasitic alveolates of the phylum Apicomplexa

== Taxonomy ==
There are two families in this taxon.

== History ==
This superfamily was established by Clopton in 2009.

== Description ==
Species in this taxon infect insects.

Syzygy is frontal or frontolateral.

The gametocysts form an epicyst (ectocyst).

The epicyst may rupture or dissolve.

The sporocysts are released either singly or in chains.
