= Gruta del Indio =

Rock shelter and archeological site in Argentina

Coordinates: 34°45′56″S 68°22′9″W

Gruta del Indio is a rock shelter located in Rincón del Atuel, Southern Mendoza, Argentina. The site is located 28 km south of the town of San Rafael at around 660m above sea level. Significant excavations suggest the coexistence of humans and mega-fauna, possibly contributing to existing theories of humans acting as major predators were large contributors to the extinction of such creatures.

The site remains one of the few in South America where evidence of large mega-fauna and human habitation exists together.

== History ==
Early archaeological excavation of the site began in 1956, conducted by Argentinian archaeologist Humberto Antonio Lagiglia unearthed lithic artifacts and proposed charcoal hearths dated to the final Pleistocene. Stratigraphic analysis classified the site into four major archaeological stages. The oldest, Atuel IV, contains evidence of large fauna habitation, proposed fire burning pits, and charcoal remnants. Atuel III contained many early formative stage artifacts. Atuel II contains sporadic evidence of agricultural artifacts. The newest stage, Atuel I is represented by pictographs, some of which depict Spanish soldiers and boat landings.

Excavation of lower strata reveal evidence of large mega-fauna, including the dermal ossicles, small bone concentrations found within the skin, attributed to certain reptiles and the extinct giant ground sloths.

== Archaeological research ==
=== Radiocarbon dating ===
In 1997, archaeologists Austin Long and Paul S. Martin conducted significant radiocarbon dating research on charcoal, dung, and bone samples within the Atuel IV and Atuel III layers. C14 analysis proposed a short window between 12,880 and 12,000 years ago when calibrated dates of charcoal and dung samples overlapped.

Later radiocarbon dating research conducted by archaeologist Alejandro Garcia on the same site proposed calibrated dates as recent as 10,170 years BP for dung, and 9,560 years BP for mega-fauna bones, arguing for a much larger window when proposed evidence of human habitation and ground sloth habitation overlapped. Despite the larger time window, no samples of dung or bones have been found with or around charcoal remains.

=== Pollen analysis ===
Alternate hypotheses regarding ground sloth extinction have been attributed to shifting flora. While pollen samples have been analyzed to as old as 30,000 years ago, major changes in pollen types around 10,000 years ago have given rise to theories that the region around Gruta del Indio became extremely arid around this time, with most indicators suggesting a decline in pollen movement and diversity, aside from long distance plants' movements. Along with this decline in vegetation, a general temperature rise has been proposed for the period.

Pollen dated to around 2,500 years ago are attributed to groups of agriculturalists who inhabited the cave following the spread of agriculture to the region. Pollen analysis of earlier samples indicates a selection for Chenopodium and Amaranthus, while beans, squash and maize appear later in the archaeological record.

=== Taphonomy ===
Excavations at the site have uncovered 599 small bones attributed to smaller mammals. Taphonomic analysis, the scientific exploration of how specimens go from the biosphere to the lithosphere, revealed few cut marks or burned remains. The discovery of digestive corrosion and owl pellets were associated with owl predation, similar to that associated with modern owls' digestive remains.

=== Paleoparasitology ===
Paleoparasitology is the study of parasites from the past, and their interactions with hosts and vectors. In analysis of various coprolites (fossilized faeces) with possible parasites endemic to birds, reptiles, and mammals all found in coprolite samples. Two taxa of parasites discovered at the site, Toxascaris leonina and a Physaloptera species found in this study are considered potentially zoonotic.
