= Fusionidae =

Scientific classification
- Domain: Eukaryota
- (unranked): SAR
- (unranked): Alveolata
- Phylum: Apicomplexa
- Class: Conoidasida
- Order: Eugregarinorida
- Suborder: Septatorina
- Superfamily: Fusionicae
- Family: Fusionidae

Genus
- Fusiona

Family of single-celled organisms

Fusionidae is a family of the superfamily Fusionicae in the phylum Apicomplexa

== Taxonomy ==
There is one genus - Fusiona - in this family.

== History ==
This family was created in 1965 by Stejskal.

== Description ==
Species in this family are homoxenous.

Gametocytes - not described

Spores - not described

Both gamonts and trophozoites are septate. The gamonts are morphologically different (anisogamous).

Sexual reproduction involves a cephalocaudal association. During syzygy the nucleus and enterocyte of the satellite move to the primite where they fuse.
