= Proleptus =

Scientific classification
- Kingdom: Animalia
- Phylum: Nematoda
- Class: Chromadorea
- Order: Rhabditida
- Family: Physalopteridae
- Genus: Proleptus; Dujardin, 1845

Genus of roundworms

Proleptus is a genus of nematodes belonging to the family Physalopteridae.

The genus has almost cosmopolitan distribution.

Species:

- Proleptus acutus Dujardin, 1845
- Proleptus anabantis Pearse, 1933
- Proleptus australis Baylis, 1933
- Proleptus carvajali Fernandez & Villalba, 1985
- Proleptus coronatus (van Beneden, 1858)
- Proleptus elegans (Örley, 1885)
- Proleptus gordioides van Beneden, 1858
- Proleptus inflatus (Linstow, 1890)
- Proleptus mackenziei Williams & Richards, 1978
- Proleptus malayi Sandosham, 1954
- Proleptus minutus (van Beneden, 1871)
- Proleptus niedmanni Torres & Grandjean, 1983
- Proleptus obtusus Dujardin, 1845
- Proleptus problematicus Kreis, 1940
- Proleptus rajae (Diesing, 1851)
- Proleptus robustus (van Beneden, 1871)
- Proleptus soridus Lent & Freitas, 1948
- Proleptus tortus Linstow, 1906
- Proleptus trygonorrhinae Johnston & Mawson, 1943
