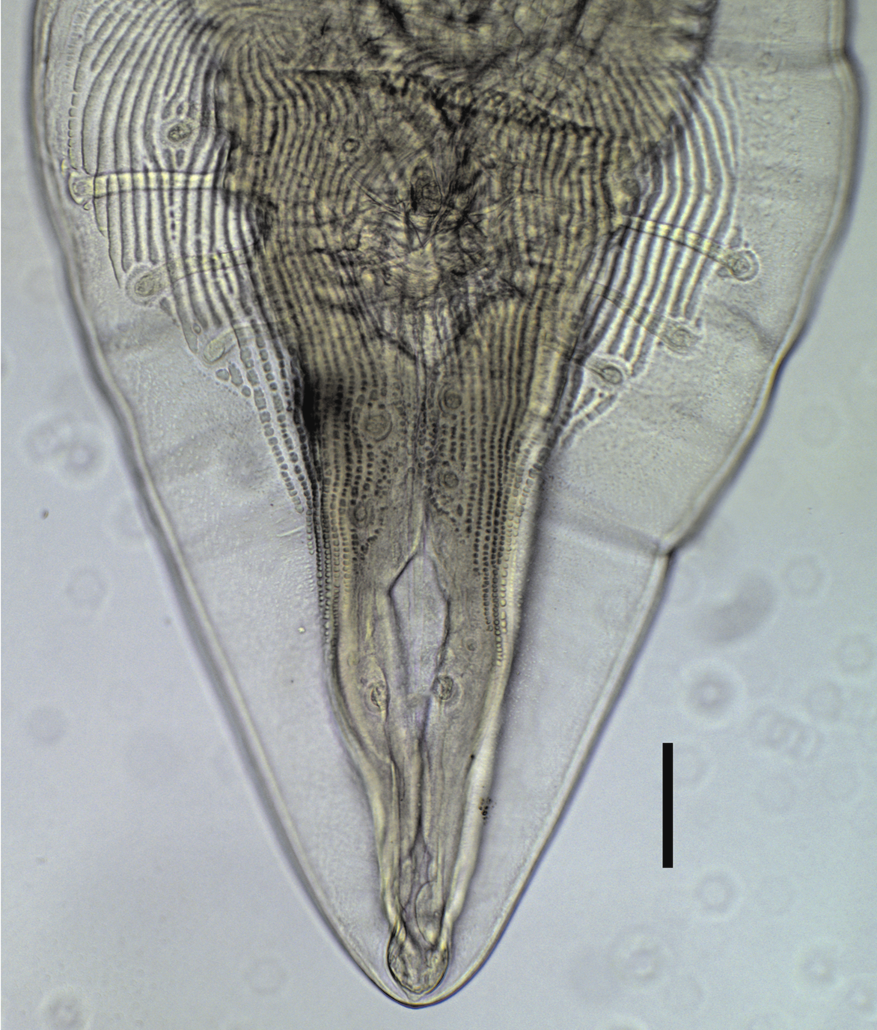
- P. ngoci, male caudal extremity
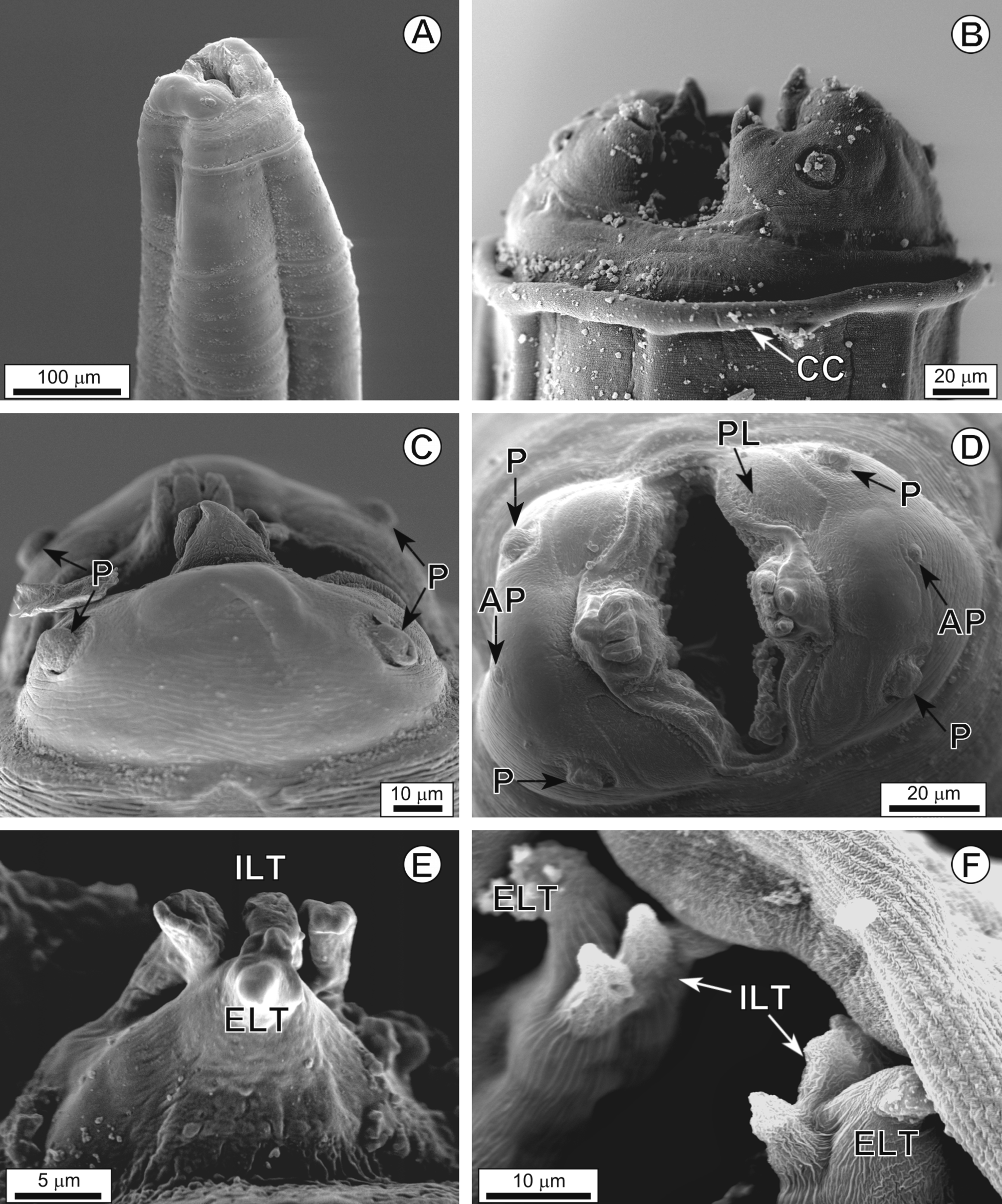
- P. ngoci, scanning electron microscopy

Scientific classification
- Kingdom: Animalia
- Phylum: Nematoda
- Class: Chromadorea
- Order: Rhabditida
- Family: Physalopteridae
- Genus: Physaloptera; Rudolphi, 1819

Species
- See text

= Physaloptera =

Genus of roundworms

Physaloptera is a genus of parasitic nematodes in the family Physalopteridae.

== Systematics ==
Species include:

- Physaloptera dilatata
- Physaloptera dispar
- Physaloptera hispida
- Physaloptera losseni
- Physaloptera maxillaris
- Physaloptera murisbrasiliensis
- Physaloptera ngoci
- Physaloptera preputialis
- Physaloptera retusa
- Physaloptera rara

Undescribed or unidentified species have been found on the hispid cotton rat (Sigmodon hispidus) in the southern United States, the marsh rice rat (Oryzomys palustris) in Florida, and Leontopithecus rosalia, Physalaemus soaresi, Cacajao calvus, and Lagothrix lagotricha in Brazil.

== Physaloptera spp. as human parasites ==
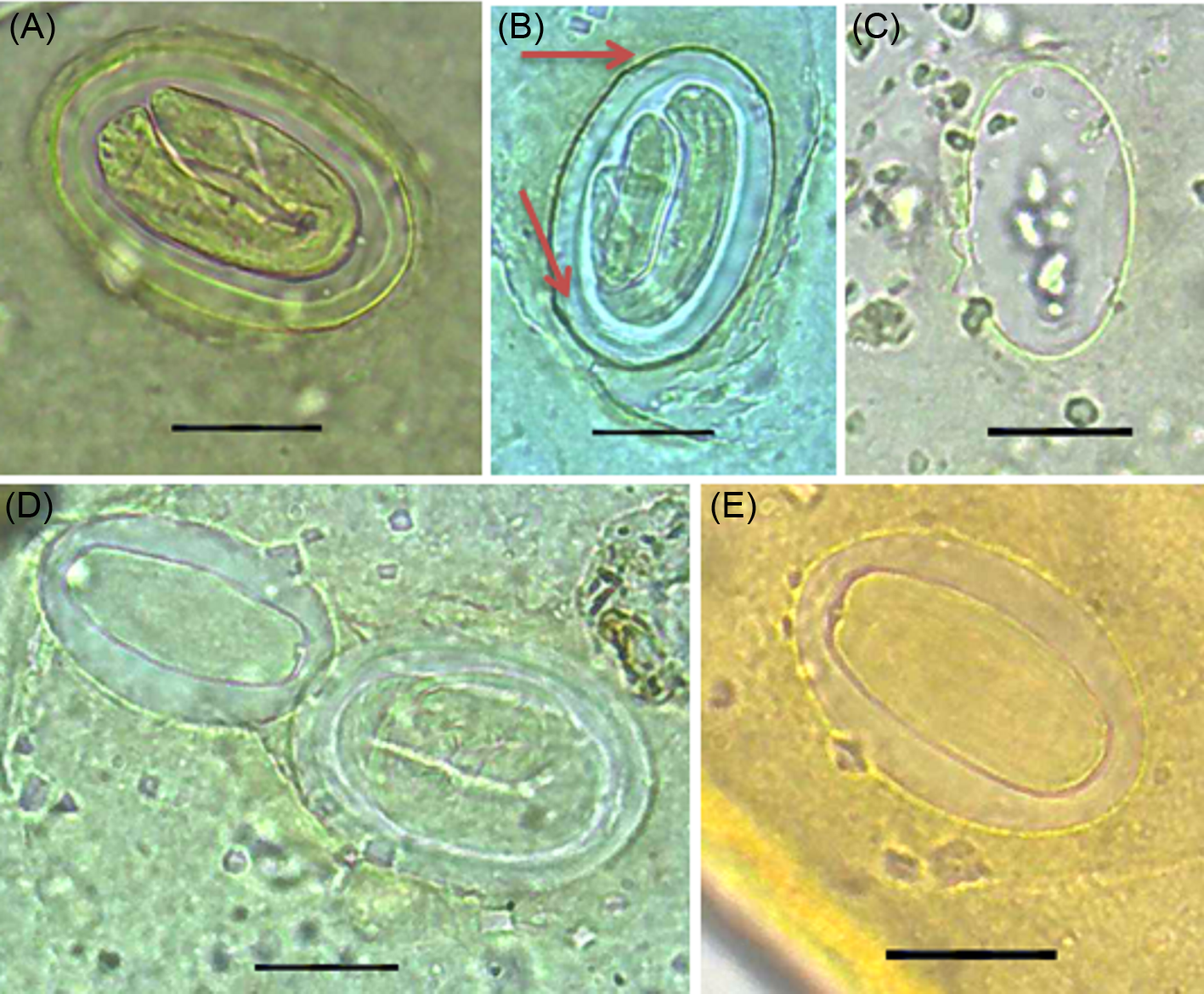
Physaloptera spp. eggs found in a grave of the Bronze Age in Iran

Most species utilize insects such as crickets, cockroaches, and beetles as intermediate hosts. Several species of Physaloptera can parasitize primates, including humans. This rare disease is known as spiruridiasis. Human infection is considered to be ancient; eggs of Physaloptera sp. were found in a grave of the Bronze Age in Iran.

== Literature cited ==
- Dragoo, J.W.; Sheffield, S.R. (2009). "Conepatus leuconotus (Carnivora: Mephitidae)". Mammalian Species. 827: 1–8. doi:10.1644/827.1.
- Kinsella, J.M. (1974). "Comparison of helminth parasites of the cotton rat, Sigmodon hispidus, from several habitats in Florida". American Museum Novitates (2540): 1–12. hdl:2246/2742.
- Kinsella, J.M. 1988. Comparison of helminths of rice rats, Oryzomys palustris, from freshwater and saltwater marshes in Florida. Proceedings of the Helminthological Society of Washington 55(2):275–280.
- Mirzayans, A (1971). "Incidence of gastrointestinal helminths of domestic cats in the Teheran area of Iran". The Journal of Parasitology. 57 (6): 1296. doi:10.2307/3277984. JSTOR 3277984. PMID 5157163.
- Muniz-Pereira, L.C.; Vieira, F.M.; Luque, J.L. (2009). "Checklist of helminth parasites of threatened vertebrate species from Brazil". Zootaxa. 2123: 1–45. doi:10.11646/zootaxa.2123.1.1.
- Santana, E.M.; Jantz, H.E.; Best, T.L. (2010). "Atelerix albiventris (Erinaceomorpha: Erinaceidae)". Mammalian Species. 42 (857): 99–110. doi:10.1644/857.1.
