= Septatorina =

Scientific classification
- Domain: Eukaryota
- Clade: Sar
- Clade: Alveolata
- Phylum: Apicomplexa
- Class: Conoidasida
- Order: Eugregarinorida
- Suborder: Septatorina; Lankester, 1885

Families and superfamilies
- Blabericolidae; Fusionicae; Gregarinicae; Porosporicae; Stenophoricae; Stylocephaloidea

Suborder of single-celled parasites

Septatorina is a suborder of parasitic alveolates of the phylum Apicomplexa

== Taxonomy ==
There are five superfamilies and one family in this suborder: superfamilies Fusionicae, Gregarinicae, Porosporicae, Stenophoricae and Stylocephaloidea; and family Blabericolidae.

== History ==
This taxon was created in 1885 by Ray Lankester.

== Description ==
The defining morphological feature of this taxon is the presence of septum dividing the gamont or trophozoite into a protomerite and deutomerite. The septum may not always be visible by light microscopy. Species in this taxon also have an epimerite.

Species in this taxon infect invertebrates and especially arthropods.
