= Stylocephalidae =

Scientific classification
- Domain: Eukaryota
- Clade: Sar
- Superphylum: Alveolata
- Phylum: Apicomplexa
- Class: Conoidasida
- Order: Eugregarinorida
- Superfamily: Stylocephaloidea
- Family: Stylocephalidae; Léger, 1892

Genera
- Atacamagregarina; Bulbocephalus; Campanacephalus; Clavicephalus; Colepismatophila; Cystocephaloides; Cystocephalus; Lepismatophila; Lophocephaloides; Lophocephalus; Oocephalus; Orbocephalus; Rhizinia; Sphaerorhynchus; Sporadina; Stylocephaloides; Stylocephalus; Xiphocephalus

Family of single-celled organisms

Stylocephalidae is a family of parasitic alveolates of the phylum Apicomplexa

== Taxonomy ==
Eighteen genera are recognised in this family.

== Description ==
Species in this taxon infect insects.
