= Porosporidae =

Scientific classification
- Domain: Eukaryota
- (unranked): SAR
- (unranked): Alveolata
- Phylum: Apicomplexa
- Class: Conoidasida
- Order: Eugregarinorida
- Suborder: Septatorina
- Superfamily: Porosporicae Chakravarty 1960
- Family: Porosporidae Labbé 1899

Genera
- Pachyporospora; Porospora; Nematopsis

Family of protists in the apicomplex phylum

Porosporidae is a family of parasitic alveolates of the phylum Apicomplexa

== Taxonomy ==
This family has 3 genera - Pachyporospora, Porospora and Nematopsis - and 37 species.

The members of this family are distinguished from the other septate gregarines by having a digenic (two host) life cycle.

== History ==
This taxon was created in 1899 by Labbé.

== Description ==
The species in this family are heteroxenous, meaning they live in two separate hosts during their life cycle. The two host species involved in their life cycle are a crustacean and a mollusc. The life cycle involves vegetative development in digestive tract of a decapod crustacean and sporogony in the connective tissue of a lamellibranch mollusc.
