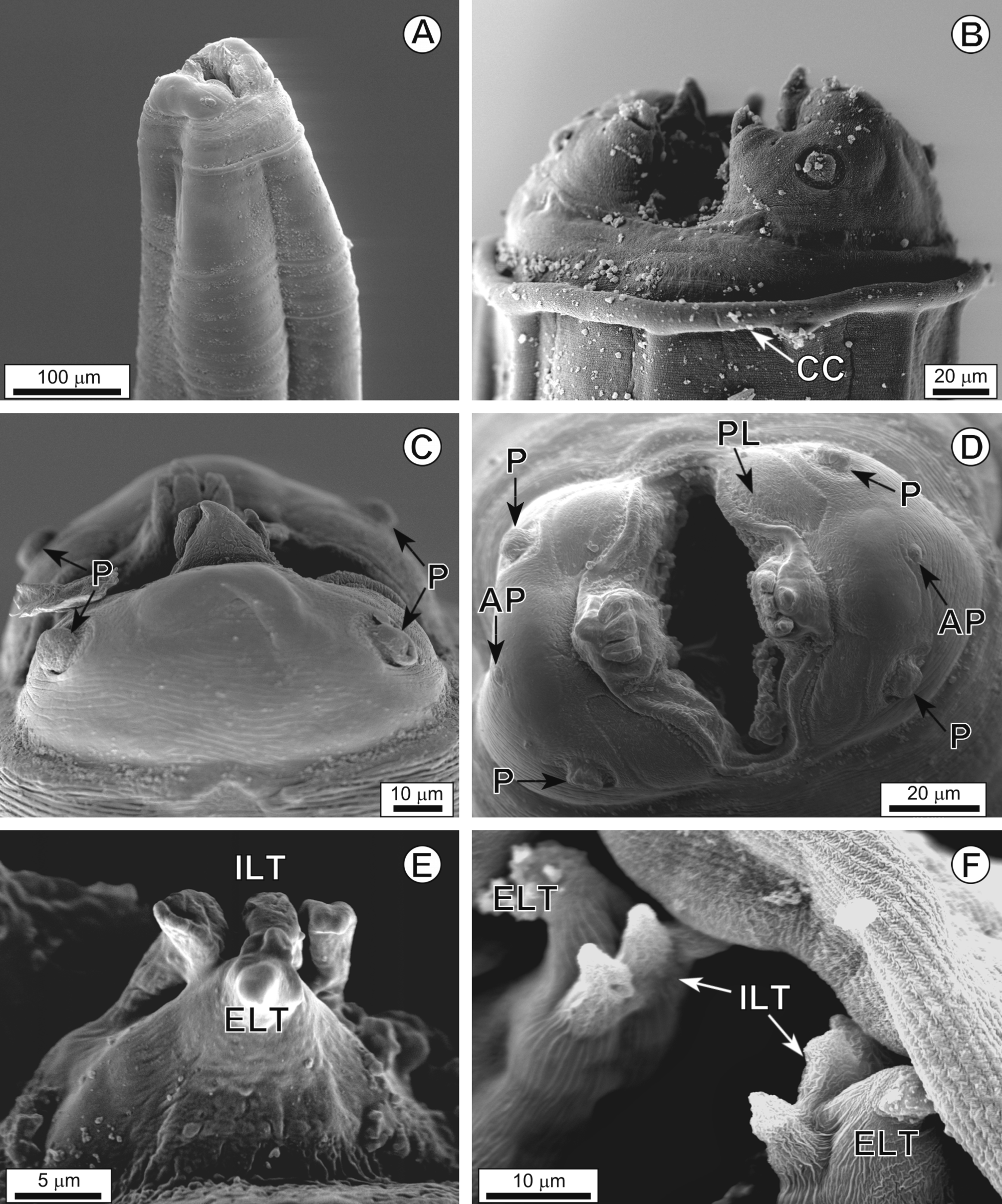
- Physaloptera ngoci, scanning electron microscopy

Scientific classification
- Kingdom: Animalia
- Phylum: Nematoda
- Class: Chromadorea
- Order: Rhabditida
- Suborder: Spirurina
- Infraorder: Spiruromorpha
- Superfamily: Physalopteroidea
- Family: Physalopteridae; Railliet, 1893

Genera
- See text

= Physalopteridae =

Family of roundworms

Physalopteridae is a family of spirurian nematodes, which belongs to the superfamily Physalopteroidea. Like all nematodes, they have neither a circulatory nor a respiratory system.

The Physalopteridae include species which are parasitic in various vertebrates.

== Systematics ==
The family includes:

- Subfamily Physalopterinae Railliet, 1893
  - Genus Physaloptera Rudolphi, 1819
  - Genus Abbreviata Travassos, 1920
- Subfamily Proleptinae Schulz, 1927
  - Genus Rasheedia Moravec & Justine, 2018
  - Genus Heliconema Travassos, 1919
  - Genus Paraleptus Wu, 1927
  - Genus Proleptus Dujardin, 1845
