= Analcitherium =

Analcitherium Temporal range: Early Miocene (Santacrucian) ~17.5 Ma

Scientific classification
- Kingdom: Animalia
- Phylum: Chordata
- Class: Mammalia
- Infraclass: Placentalia
- Order: Pilosa
- Suborder: Folivora
- Family: †Scelidotheriidae
- Genus: †Analcitherium; Ameghino, 1891
- Species: †A. antarticum

Binomial name
- †Analcitherium antarticum Ameghino, 1891

Extinct genus of ground sloths

Analcitherium is an extinct genus of scelidotheriid sloth that lived during the Early Miocene in what is now Argentina. Fossils have been found in the Santa Cruz Formation of Argentina.

== Taxonomy ==
Analcitherium was first named by Florentino Ameghino in 1891 based on fossils found in Argentina, dating to the Early Miocene. Originally thought to belong to a juvenile Nematherium. It is now usually considered to be a distinct genus.

Analcitherium is a member of the Scelidotheriidae, a group of terrestrial sloths known from the Oligocene and Pleistocene that a characterized by an elongated snout. Although scelidotheriids are usually placed as a subfamily of the Mylodontidae, they are sometimes considered to be a separate family, Scelidotheriidae.

Below is a phylogenetic tree of the Mylodontidae, based on the work of Varela et al. 2018.

- Mylodontidae
  - Nematherium
  - - Scelidotheriinae
      - Analcitherium
      - - Neonematherium
        - - Sibyllotherium
          - - Proscelidodon
            - - Catonyx
              - - Scelidotherium
                - Valgipes
    - - Pseudoprepotherium
      - - Orophodontinae?
          - Brievabradys
          - - Octodontotherium
            - - Paroctodontotherium
              - - Octomylodon
                - - Urumacotherium
                  - - Baraguatherium
                    - Octodontobradys
        - Mylodontinae
          - Mylodon
          - - - Thinobadistes
              - - Lestodon
                - - Lestobradys
                  - Bolivartherium
            - - - Simomylodon
                - Pleurolestodon
              - - Glossotherium
                - Paramylodon
