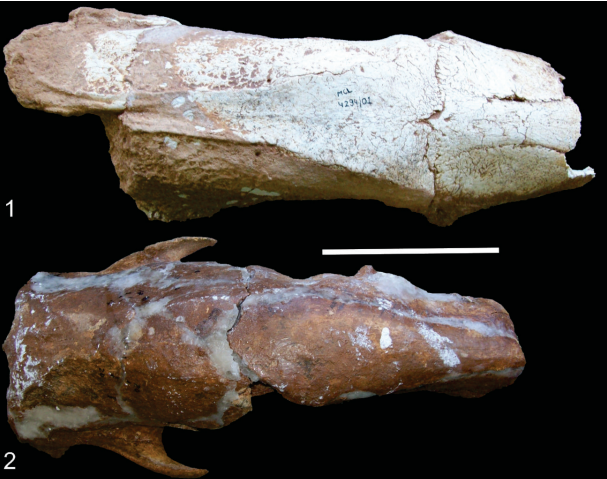
- Skull of Valgipes bucklandi in dorsal view

Scientific classification
- Kingdom: Animalia
- Phylum: Chordata
- Class: Mammalia
- Order: Pilosa
- Suborder: Folivora
- Family: †Scelidotheriidae
- Genus: †Valgipes; Gervais 1874
- Species: †V. bucklandi

Binomial name
- †Valgipes bucklandi Lund 1846

Synonyms
- Myrmecophaga gigantea Lund 1839; Platyonyx bucklandi Lund 1840; Valgipes deformis Gervais 1874; Catonyx giganteus Winge 1915

= Valgipes =

Valgipes Temporal range: Late Pleistocene-Early Holocene (Lujanian) ~0.126–0.010 Ma

Extinct genus of ground sloths

Valgipes is an extinct genus of scelidotheriid ground sloth, endemic to intertropical Brazil and Uruguay during the Late Pleistocene. Thought to have been a forest-dwelling browser, Valgipes is a monotypic genus with a complex and long taxonomic history, and is a close relative of Catonyx and Proscelidodon.

== Taxonomy ==
The taxonomic history of Scelidotheriidae in Brazil is convoluted, and only one species of Valgipes, V. bucklandi, is recognised today, named in honour of William Buckland. Based on the remains of 23 individuals discovered in Lagoa Santa, Minas Gerais, in 1846 Peter Wilhelm Lund described two Brazilian scelidotheriids, Scelidotherium owenii and Scelidotherium bucklandi, while Winge (1915) named them as Scelidotherium magnum and Catonyx giganteus. In 1874, Paul Gervais erected the genus Valgipes for a different species, V. deformis, which he based on a calcaneum bone which he classified as scelidotheriid. Based on comparison of the heel bone with that of Megalonyx, in 1954 Robert Hoffstetter considered that the calcaneum came from an unusual member of the family Megalonychidae, a convention followed by later palaeontologists (although the species was declared incertae sedis in 1979) until the material was studied in further detail, leading to V. deformis and S. bucklandi being combined as Valgipes bucklandi by Cartelle et al. (2009). The only other valid scelidotheriid known from Brazil is Catonyx cuvieri. Valgipes is differentiated from Catonyx based on dentition and postcranial morphology.

Below is a phylogenetic tree of the Scelidotheriinae, based on the work of Nieto et al. 2021, showing the position of Valgipes.

- Scelidotheriinae
  - Sibyllotherium guenguelianum
  - - Neonematherium flabellatum
    - - Scelidotherium
      - - Proscelidodon gracillimus
        - - Proscelidodon patrius
          - - - - Proscelidodon rothi
                - Valgipes bucklandi
            - - - Catonyx cuvieri
                - Catonyx tarijensis
                - Catonyx chiliense

== Description ==
It is similar in size and morphology to Catonyx, with longer and more gracile limb bones, and a wider skull. A number of adult skulls have sagittal crests, while others do not, suggesting possible sexual dimorphism. The claws are narrow and curve gently towards the palm, with the largest claw being on the third digit. Like some other members of the families Mylodontidae and Scelidotheriidae, it had bony osteoderms embedded in its skin.

== Paleobiology ==
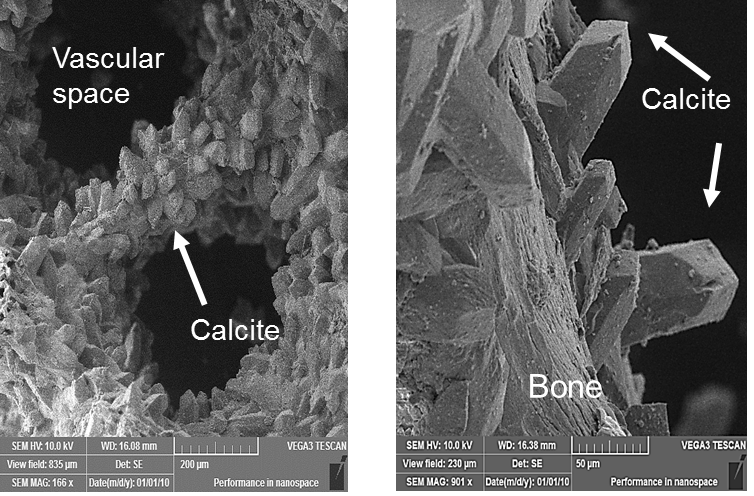
Permineralization in vertebra from Valgipes bucklandi

During the Late Pleistocene, the habitat type of the regions inhabited by Valgipes is thought to have been mainly tropical dry forest. Isotopic analysis of a specimen from Rio Grande do Norte indicates it was a browsing animal which lived in relatively closed environments, including the Atlantic Forest, and had a varied diet of leaves, shoots, roots, and fruits. In 2021, fossils attributed to V. bucklandi were described from southern Uruguay, in the cooler pampean region, around two thousand kilometres south of all other records.

Unlike many other ground sloths it was contemporary with, V. bucklandi was obligately terrestrial and most likely did not engage in digging or climbing behaviours.

A palaeopathology likely representing a pitutary tumour has been discovered in the V. bucklandi specimen MCT 3993-M.

== Distribution ==
Fossils of V. bucklandi have been found in:

Pleistocene

- Iraquara; Nova Redenção; and Serra do Ramalho, Bahia, Brazil
- Lagoa Santa and São João das Missões, Minas Gerais, Brazil
- Coronel José Dias, Piauí, Brazil
- Felipe Guerra, Rio Grande do Norte, Brazil
- Canelones, Uruguay

== Paleoecology ==
In the Brazilian Intertropical Region in eastern Brazil, Valgipes was a browser in arboreal savannahs and forested grasslands. Large, mesoherbivorous mammals in the BIR were widespread and diverse, including the cow-like toxodontids Toxodon platensis and Piauhytherium, the macraucheniid litoptern Xenorhinotherium and equids such as Hippidion principale and Equus neogaeus. Toxodontids were large mixed feeders as well and lived in forested areas, while the equids were nearly entirely grazers. Other xenarthran fossils are present in the area as well from several different families, like the giant megatheriid ground sloth Eremotherium, the fellow scelidotheriid Catonyx, the mylodontids Glossotherium, Ocnotherium, and Mylodonopsis. Smaller ground sloths such as the megalonychids Ahytherium and Australonyx and the nothrotheriid Nothrotherium have also been found in the area. Eremotherium was a generalist, while Nothrotherium was a specialist for trees in low density forests, and Valgipes was an intermediate of the two that lived in arboreal savannahs. Other glyptodonts and cingulates like the grazing glyptodonts Glyptotherium and Panochthus and the omnivorous pampatheres Pampatherium and Holmesina were present in the open grasslands. A proboscidean species has also been found in the BIR, Notiomastodon platensis, which was also present and was a mixed grazer on the open grasslands. Carnivores included some of the largest known mammalian land carnivores, like the giant felid Smilodon populator and the bear Arctotherium wingei. Several extant taxa are also known from the BIR, like guanacos, giant anteaters, collared peccaries, and striped hog-nosed skunks. Two crab-eating types of extant mammals are also known from the BIR, the crab-eating raccoon and the crab-eating fox, indicating that crabs were also present in the region. The environment of the BIR is unclear, as there were both several species that were grazers, but the precede of the arboreal fossil monkeys Protopithecus and Caipora in the area causes confusion over the area’s paleoenvironment. Most of Brazil was thought to have been covered in open tropical cerrado vegetation during the Late Pleistocene, but if Protopithecus and Caipora were arboreal, their presence suggests that the region may have supported a dense closed forest during the Late Pleistocene. It is possible that the region alternated between dry open savannah and closed wet forest throughout the climate change of the Late Pleistocene.
