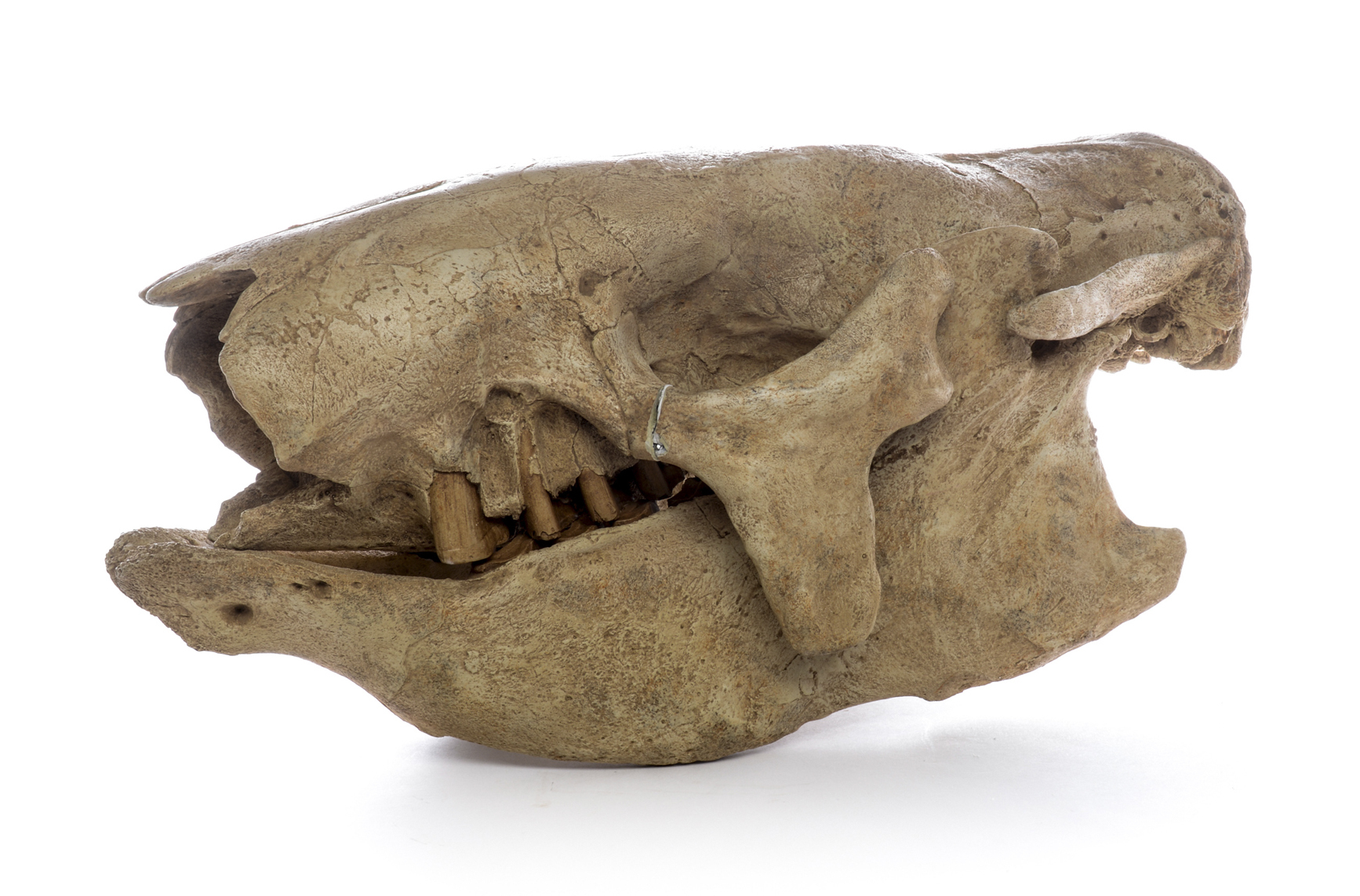
- Replica of a Catonyx skull at the Museo delle Scienze

Scientific classification
- Kingdom: Animalia
- Phylum: Chordata
- Class: Mammalia
- Infraclass: Placentalia
- Order: Pilosa
- Suborder: Folivora
- Family: †Scelidotheriidae
- Genus: †Catonyx; Ameghino, 1891

Species
- C. cuvieri Lund, 1839; C. chiliensis Lydekker, 1886; C. tarijensis Gervais and Ameghino, 1880

= Catonyx =

Catonyx Temporal range: Early Pliocene-Early Holocene (Montehermosan-Lujanian) ~2.5–0.010 Ma

Extinct genus of ground sloths

Catonyx is an extinct genus of ground sloth of the family Scelidotheriidae, endemic to South America during the Pliocene and Pleistocene epochs. It lived from 2.5 Ma to about 10,000 years ago, existing for approximately 2.49 million years. The most recent date obtained is about 9600 B.P.

== Description ==
This animal, like many other terrestrial sloths, was of conspicuous size and mighty build. It had to reach and exceed 4 meters in length, and the skull alone was at least 50 centimeters long. Its weight has been estimated at over 1500 kg. The snout of Catonyx was elongated, although not as in some similar forms (e.g., Scelidotherium). Unlike the latter, Catonyx possessed shorter premaxillae that formed a triangular (and not rectangular like Scelidotherium) snout tip, a pronounced rostrum bulge, a palate equipped with a median groove, and larger teeth. In addition, the mandibular symphysis was elongated and elevated, and the posterior lobe of the lower fourth molar was more curved than that of Scelidotherium. Like all terrestrial sloths, Scelidotherium possessed strong-boned limbs and large claws.

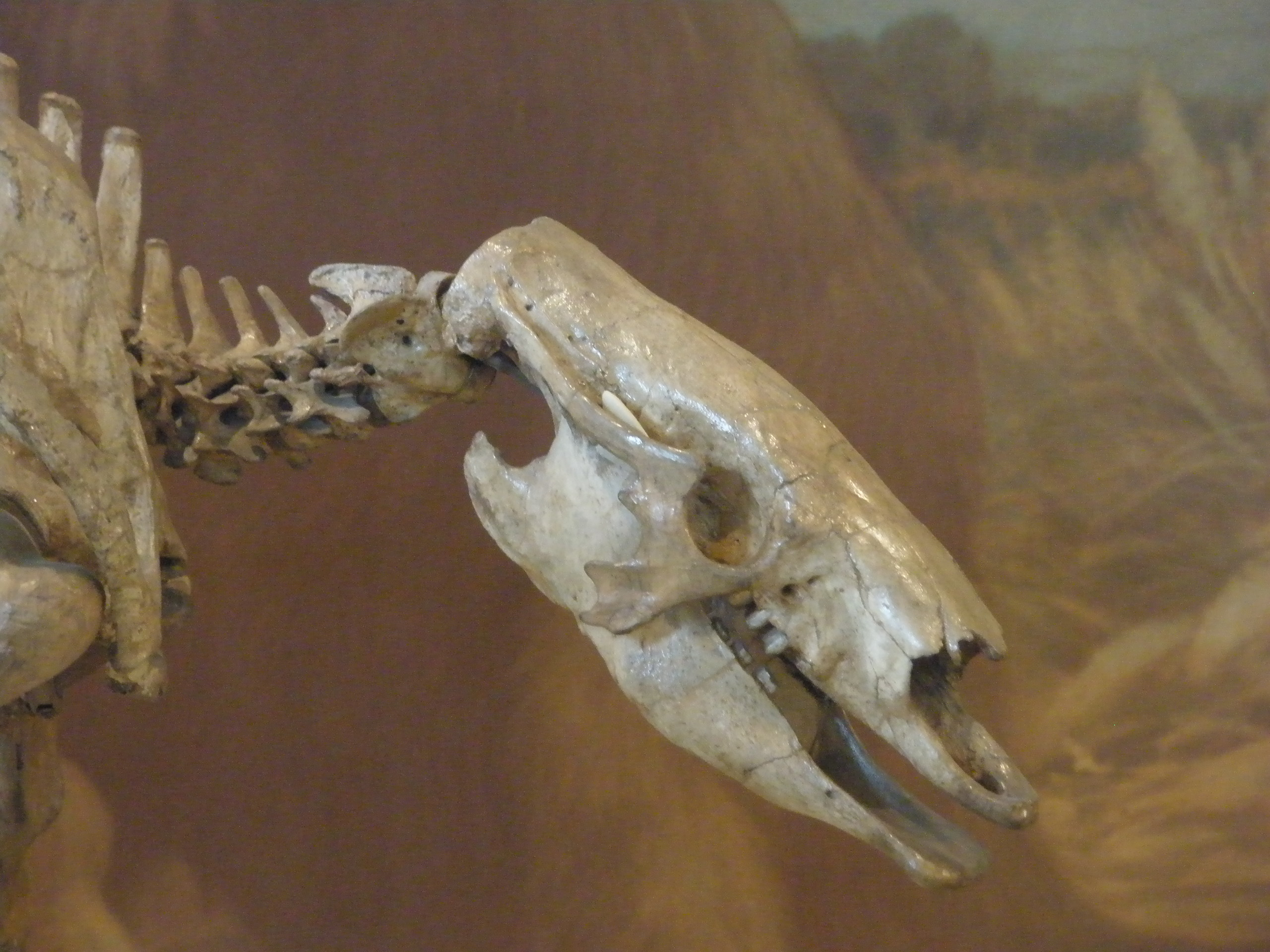
Skull of Catonyx cuvieri

== Taxonomy ==
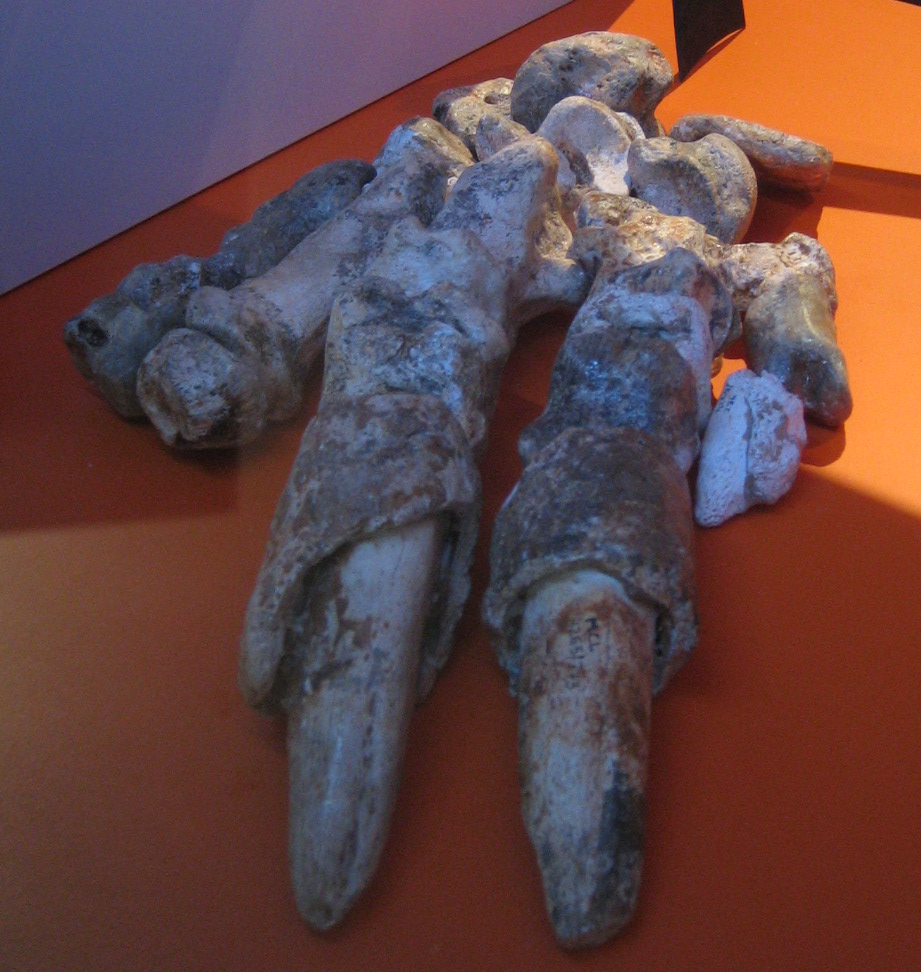
Hand bones.

At a cave in Lagoa Santa, Brazil, Peter Wilhelm Lund and his crew members collected the fragmentary fossils of a fossil sloth that Wilhelm named Megalonyx cuvieri in 1838. Catonyx, the genus name, was made by Ameghino in 1891. It was assigned to Scelidotheriinae by Gaudin in 1995. Scelidotheriinae was elevated back to family status by Presslee et al. in 2019.

The very first fossils of this animal were found in Upper Pleistocene strata of Brazil and were described by Lund in 1839, but for a long time there was considerable systematic confusion: the remains were gradually attributed to the genera Scelidotherium and Scelidodon. Only recently have revisions based on clear morphological anatomy been proposed, according to which the genera Scelidotherium and Catonyx are two valid taxa, while Scelidodon may or may not be a valid genus. Catonyx, in any case, is a member of the Scelidotheriidae, a group of terrestrial sloths known from the Miocene, Pliocene, and Pleistocene and characterized by an elongated snout; scelidotheres themselves part are usually placed as a subfamily of the Mylodontidae, although they are sometimes considered a separate family, Scelidotheriidae.

The type species of Catonyx is Catonyx cuvieri, named in 1839 by Peter Wilhelm Lund. C. cuvieri has been found in Brazil and Uruguay, and dates to the Late Pleistocene and likely the Early Holocene. Other species attributed to this genus but are sometimes considered to belong to a separate genus, Scelidodon, are C. tarijensis and C. chiliense, found in Chile, Argentina, Uruguay, Bolivia, and Ecuador.

Below is a phylogenetic tree of the Scelidotheriinae, based on the work of Nieto and colleagues (2020), showing the position of Catonyx.

- Scelidotheriinae
  - Sibyllotherium guenguelianum
  - - Neonematherium flabellatum
    - - Scelidotherium
      - - Proscelidodon gracillimus
        - - Proscelidodon patrius
          - - - - Proscelidodon rothi
                - Valgipes bucklandi
            - - - Catonyx cuvieri
                - Catonyx tarijensis
                - Catonyx chiliense

== Palaeobiology ==
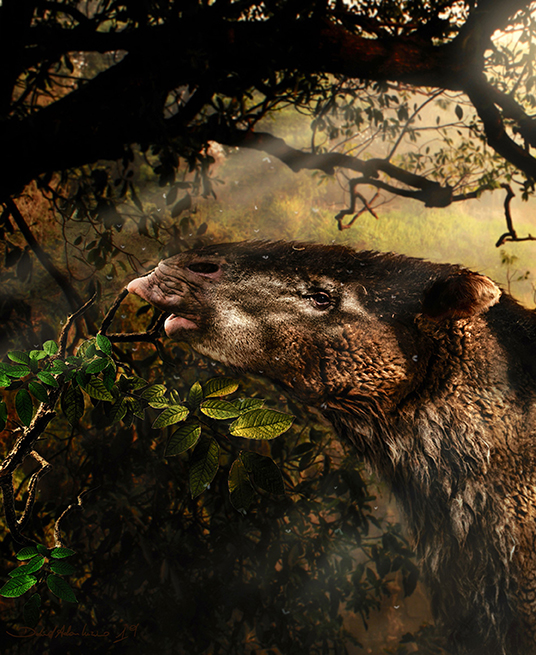
Hypothetical life reconstruction of C. tarijensis showing its inferred feeding behavior. The reconstruction is based on the skull MNHN-Bol V 13364 from the Pleistocene of Oruro (Bolivian Altiplano).

The cranial anatomy of the species C. tarijensis indicates it may have been a browser which used its strong lips to grab vegetation, and Santos Pereira et al. (2013) tentatively suggested browsing habits for C. cuvieri. Isotopic analysis of Smilodon populator remains from Brazil indicates that Catonyx was one of its main prey items.

== Fossil distribution ==
Fossils of Catonyx have been uncovered in Brazil, the San José Formation of Uruguay, the Tezanos Pinto Formation of Argentina, and the Tarija Valley of Bolivia.

== Paleoecology ==
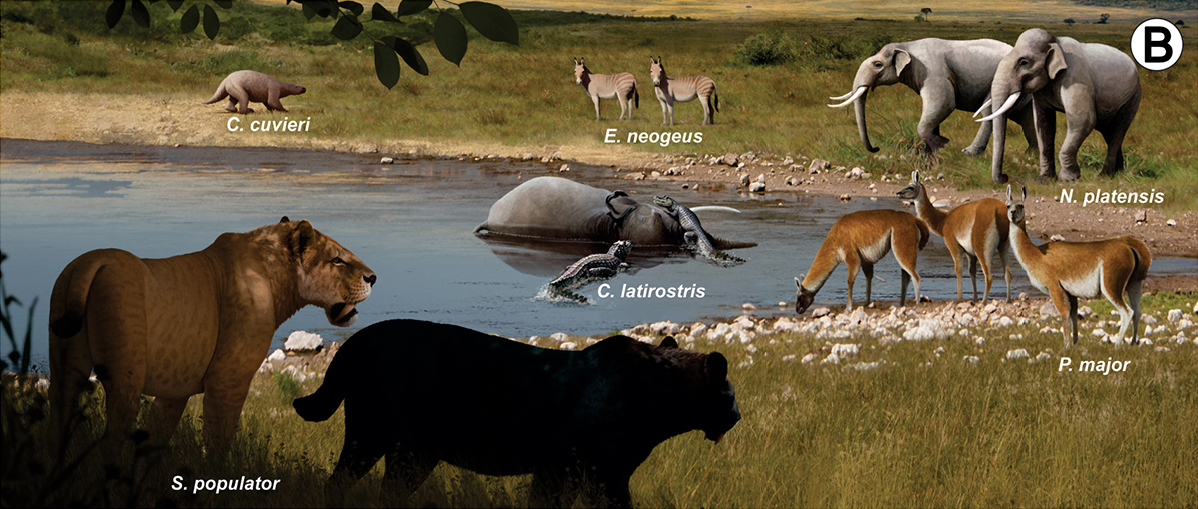
Life restoration of C. cuvieri (upper left) and contemporary animals

In the Brazilian Intertropical Region in eastern Brazil, Catonyx was a browser in arboreal savannahs and forested grasslands. Large, mesoherbivorous mammals in the BIR were widespread and diverse, including the cow-like toxodontids Toxodon platensis and Piauhytherium, the macraucheniid litoptern Xenorhinotherium and equids such as Hippidion principale and Equus neogaeus. Toxodontids were large mixed feeders as well and lived in forested areas, while the equids were nearly entirely grazers. Other xenarthran fossils are present in the area as well from several different families, like the giant megatheriid ground sloth Eremotherium, the fellow scelidotheriid Valgipes, the mylodontids Glossotherium, Ocnotherium, and Mylodonopsis. Smaller ground sloths such as the megalonychids Ahytherium and Australonyx and the nothrotheriid Nothrotherium have also been found in the area. Eremotherium was a generalist, while Nothrotherium was a specialist for trees in low density forests, and Valgipes was an intermediate of the two that lived in arboreal savannahs. Other glyptodonts and cingulates like the grazing glyptodonts Glyptotherium and Panochthus and the omnivorous pampatheres Pampatherium and Holmesina were present in the open grasslands. A proboscidean species has also been found in the BIR, Notiomastodon platensis, which was also present and was a mixed grazer on the open grasslands. Carnivores included some of the largest known mammalian land carnivores, like the giant felid Smilodon populator and the bear Arctotherium wingei. Several extant taxa are also known from the BIR, like guanacos, giant anteaters, collared peccaries, and striped hog-nosed skunks. Two crab-eating types of extant mammals are also known from the BIR, the crab-eating raccoon and the crab-eating fox, indicating that crabs were also present in the region. The environment of the BIR is unclear, as there were both several species that were grazers, but the precede of the arboreal fossil monkeys Protopithecus and Caipora in the area causes confusion over the area's paleoenvironment. Most of Brazil was thought to have been covered in open tropical cerrado vegetation during the Late Pleistocene, but if Protopithecus and Caipora were arboreal, their presence suggests that the region may have supported a dense closed forest during the Late Pleistocene. It is possible that the region alternated between dry open savannah and closed wet forest throughout the climate change of the Late Pleistocene.
