= Neonematherium =

Neonematherium Temporal range: Early Miocene-Late Miocene (Friasian-Chasicoan) ~16.3–7.0 Ma

Scientific classification
- Kingdom: Animalia
- Phylum: Chordata
- Class: Mammalia
- Order: Pilosa
- Suborder: Folivora
- Family: †Scelidotheriidae
- Genus: †Neonematherium; Ameghino 1904
- Species: †N. flabellatum

Binomial name
- †Neonematherium flabellatum Ameghino 1904

Extinct genus of ground sloths

Neonematherium is an extinct genus of scelidotheriid ground sloths that lived in Argentina, Chile, and Colombia during the Early to Late Miocene. Fossils have been found in the Honda Group of Colombia, and the Río Frías Formation of Chile.

== Taxonomy ==
Neonematherium is a member of the Scelidotheriidae, a family of ground sloths known from the Oligocene, Miocene Pliocene, Pleistocene, and the Early Holocene epochs and are characterized by an elongated snout. Scelidotheres themselves part are usually placed as a subfamily of the Mylodontidae, although they are sometimes considered a separate family, Scelidotheriidae.

Below is a phylogenetic tree of the Scelidotheriidae, based on the work of Nieto et al. 2021, showing the position of Neonematherium.

- Scelidotheriinae
  - Sibyllotherium guenguelianum
  - - Neonematherium flabellatum
    - - Scelidotherium
      - - Proscelidodon gracillimus
        - - Proscelidodon patrius
          - - - - Proscelidodon rothi
                - Valgipes bucklandi
            - - - Catonyx cuvieri
                - Catonyx tarijensis
                - Catonyx chiliense
