= Chubutherium =

Chubutherium Temporal range: Late Oligocene-Early Miocene (Deseadan-Colhuehuapian) ~29.0–21.0 Ma

Scientific classification
- Domain: Eukaryota
- Kingdom: Animalia
- Phylum: Chordata
- Class: Mammalia
- Order: Pilosa
- Family: †Scelidotheriidae
- Genus: †Chubutherium; Cattoi, 1962

Species
- †C. ferelloii

Extinct genus of ground sloths

Chubutherium is an extinct genus of ground sloth from the Late Oligocene and Early Miocene of Chubut Province, Argentina.

== Description ==
This species of ground sloth was assigned to the family Scelidotheriidae, which was subsequently demoted to subfamily Scelidotheriinae within Mylodontidae, then elevated back to full family status. It is related to the Pleistocene genus, Scelidotherium. It possessed but a few molars, like many other sloths. Only a few specimens have been found in Patagonia. Little material is found of the genus and the taxonomic position is still debated.
