= Proscelidodon =

Proscelidodon Temporal range: Late Miocene-Late Pliocene (Huayquerian-Chapadmalalan) ~9.0–3.0 Ma
- Skull of Proscelidodon in the Royal Ontario Museum, Toronto

Scientific classification
- Kingdom: Animalia
- Phylum: Chordata
- Class: Mammalia
- Order: Pilosa
- Family: †Scelidotheriidae
- Genus: †Proscelidodon; Bordas, 1935

Type species
- †Proscelidodon patrius Ameghino, 1883

Other species
- †P. gracillimus Rovereto, 1914; †P. rothi Kraglievich, 1923

Extinct genus of ground sloths

Proscelidodon is an extinct genus of ground sloths in the family Scelidotheriidae. It lived during the Miocene and Pliocene of what is now Argentina and Bolivia. The genus was described in 1935.

== Taxonomy ==
During the Quaternary the taxonomic diversification of the Scelidotheriidae took place, with four species belonging to the genera Scelidodon, Catonyx, and Scelidotherium; the pre-quaternary Scelidotheriidae are rare. The discovery of an almost complete maxilla of Proscelidodon from the Maimará Formation (late Miocene), Jujuy province, provides new data on the plesiomorphic condition of the clade, the biogeographical history of the group during the Mio–Pliocene, and on the Maimará faunal assemblage. In addition, fossils assigned to Proscelidodon have also been found in the Cerro Azul Formation in Argentina.
