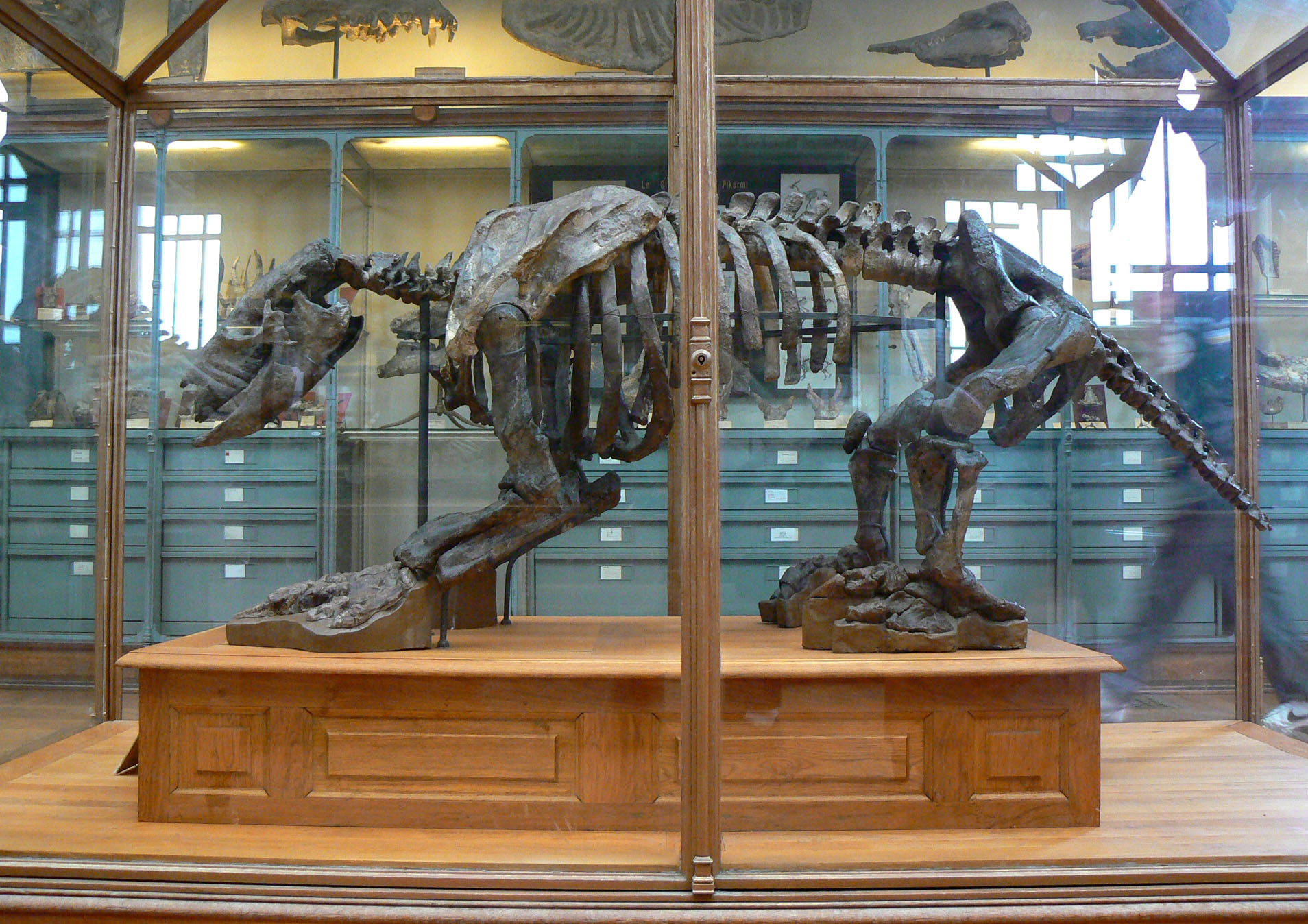
- Scelidotherium leptocephalum in Paris

Scientific classification
- Kingdom: Animalia
- Phylum: Chordata
- Class: Mammalia
- Infraclass: Placentalia
- Order: Pilosa
- Suborder: Folivora
- Superfamily: Mylodontoidea
- Family: †Scelidotheriidae; Ameghino 1889

Genera
- †Analcitherium; †Catonyx; †Chubutherium; †Nematherium; †Neonematherium; †Proscelidodon; †Scelidodon; †Scelidotheridium; †Scelidotheriops; †Scelidotherium; †Sibyllotherium; †Valgipes

= Scelidotheriidae =

Scelidotheriidae Temporal range: Late Oligocene-Late Pleistocene (Deseadan-Lujanian) ~29–0.009 Ma

Extinct family of prehistoric ground sloths

Scelidotheriidae is a family of extinct ground sloths within the order Pilosa, suborder Folivora and superfamily Mylodontoidea, related to the other extinct mylodontoid family, Mylodontidae, as well as to the living two-toed sloth family Choloepodidae. The only other extant family of the suborder Folivora is the distantly related Bradypodidae. Erected as the family Scelidotheriidae by Ameghino in 1889, the taxon was demoted to a subfamily of Mylodontidae by Gaudin in 1995. However, recent collagen sequence data indicates the group is less closely related to Mylodon and Lestodon than Choloepus is, and thus it has been elevated back to full family status by Presslee et al. (2019).

== Taxonomy ==
Together with Mylodontidae, and the two-toed sloths, the scelidotheriids form the superfamily Mylodontoidea. Chubutherium is an ancestral and very plesiomorphic member of this family and does not belong to the main group of closely related genera.

=== Phylogeny ===
The following sloth family phylogenetic tree is based on collagen and mitochondrial DNA sequence data (see Fig. 4 of Presslee et al., 2019).

- Folivora
  - † Megalocnidae (Caribbean sloths)
  - - Mylodontoidea
      - - † Scelidotheriidae
          - † Scelidodon sp.
          - † Scelidotherium sp.
      - - † Mylodontidae
          - † Lestodon armatus
          - - † Paramylodon harlani
            - - † Glossotherium robustus
              - † Mylodon darwinii
        - Choloepodidae (two-toed sloths)
          - Choloepus didactylus
          - Choloepus hoffmanni
    - Megatherioidea
      - - † Megalonychidae
        - Bradypodidae (three-toed sloths)
      - - † Nothrotheriidae
        - † Megatheriidae

Below is a more detailed cladogram of the Scelidotheriidae, based on the work of Nieto et al. 2020.

- Scelidotheriinae
  - Sibyllotherium guenguelianum
  - - Neonematherium flabellatum
    - - Scelidotherium
      - - Proscelidodon gracillimus
        - - Proscelidodon patrius
          - - - - Proscelidodon rothi
                - Valgipes bucklandi
            - - - Catonyx cuvieri
                - Catonyx tarijensis
                - Catonyx chiliense

== Palaeoecology ==
Dental mesowear of a scelidotheriine tooth from Goias suggests that scelidotheriines were adapted for a grinding, abrasive diet. The same specimen's δ^{13}C values indicate that C_{3} plants were the mainstay of its diet.
