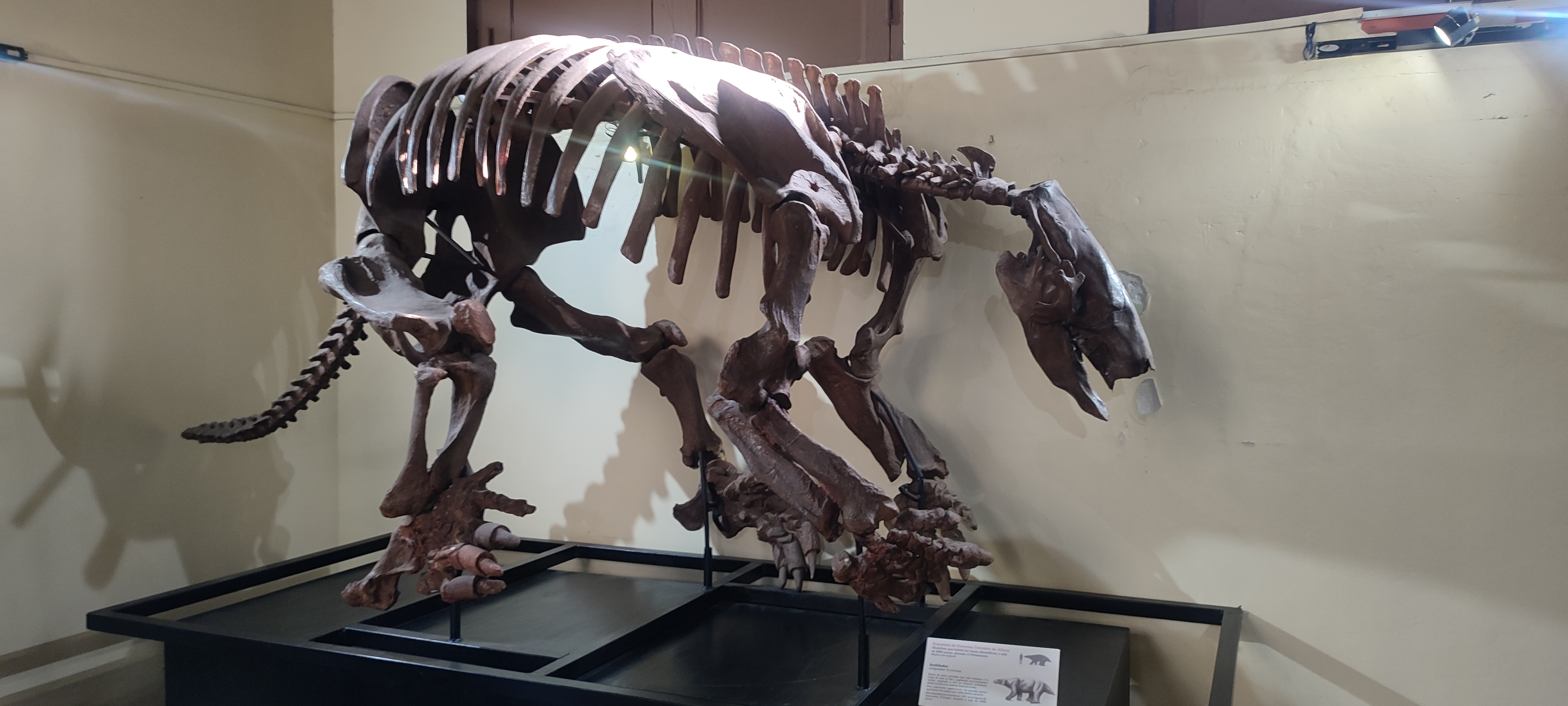
- Skeletal mount in Museo de Historia Natural de Lima

Scientific classification
- Domain: Eukaryota
- Kingdom: Animalia
- Phylum: Chordata
- Class: Mammalia
- Order: Pilosa
- Family: †Scelidotheriidae
- Genus: †Scelidodon; Ameghino, 1881

Type species
- †Scelidodon copei Ameghino, 1881

Other species
- S. capellini Gervais & Ameghino, 1880; S. chiliense Lydekker, 1886; S. piauiense Guerin & Faure, 2003; S. tarijarensis Gervais & Ameghino, 1880

Synonyms
- Scelidotherium tarijarensis (Gervais & Ameghino, 1880); Scelidotherium capellini (Gervais & Ameghino, 1880)

= Scelidodon =

Scelidodon Temporal range: Early Pleistocene Early Holocene (Uquian-Lujanian) ~0.781–0.009 Ma

Extinct genus of ground sloths

Scelidodon is an extinct genus of South American ground sloths. Its remains have been found in the Yupoí and Uspara Formations of Argentina, the Ulloma, Umala, Ñuapua and Tarija Formations of Bolivia, in Brazil, in Chile and in Peru. The youngest fossils have been dated to as recently as 9000 B.P.

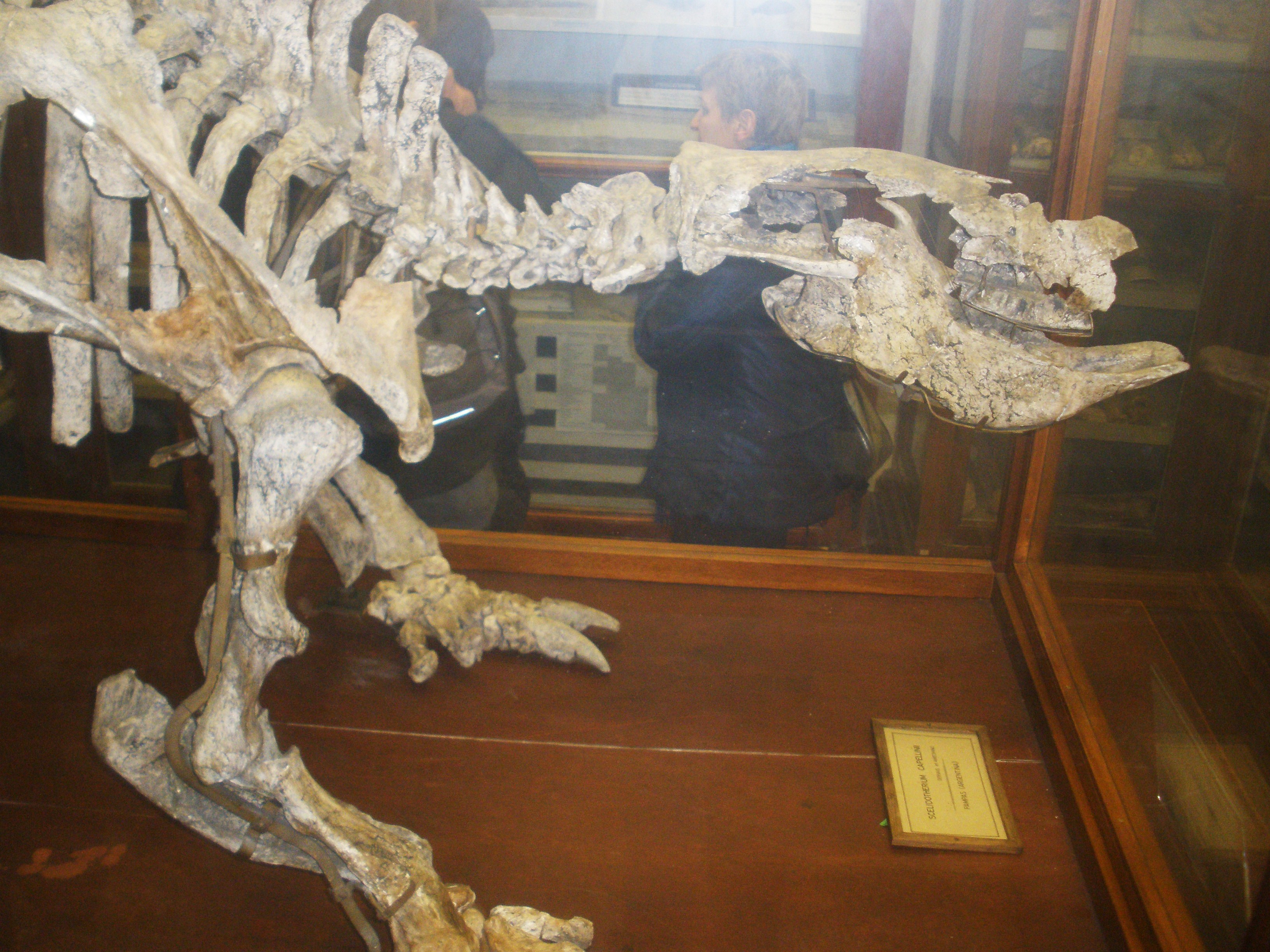
Scelidodon tarijarensis front

== Description ==
Scelidodon was one of the last of the ground sloths and was one of the largest scelidotheriids, with S. chiliense reaching up to 4.7 meters. Its body weight has been estimated at over 1500 kg. Scelidodon was widely distributed in temperate grassland environments and due to its contemporary megatheriines being high browsers, this suggests that Scelidodon was a grazer like its close relative, Scelidotherium.

== Discovery ==
The first remains of Scelidodon were collected in the 1850s in Tarija Valley, Bolivia and consisted of a skull and mandible (MNHN TAR 1260). It wasn't until 1880 that Paul Gervais and Florentino Ameghino described the remains as Scelidotherium tarijarensis. In the same paper, Scelidotherium capellini was described based on a left hemimandible (MNHN PAM 231) with a referred skull (MACN 994), the fossils were found at ‘‘Toscas del Rio de la Plata’’ in Argentina. The genus Scelidodon was erected in 1881 with the type species, Scelidodon copei, name by Ameghino. The type specimen (MACN A-1158) of S. copei comes from Ensenadan sediments in Mercedes, Buenos Aires province and consists of a left maxilla. S. tarijarensis and S. capellini were transferred to Scelidodon in 1889 by Ameghino. S. chiliense was named based on a skull (BMNH M 2819) from the late Pleistocene of Chile by Richard Lydekker in 1886. Since the 19th century, much material of Scelidodon has been found from 5 countries and is one of the most well preserved scelidotheres.
