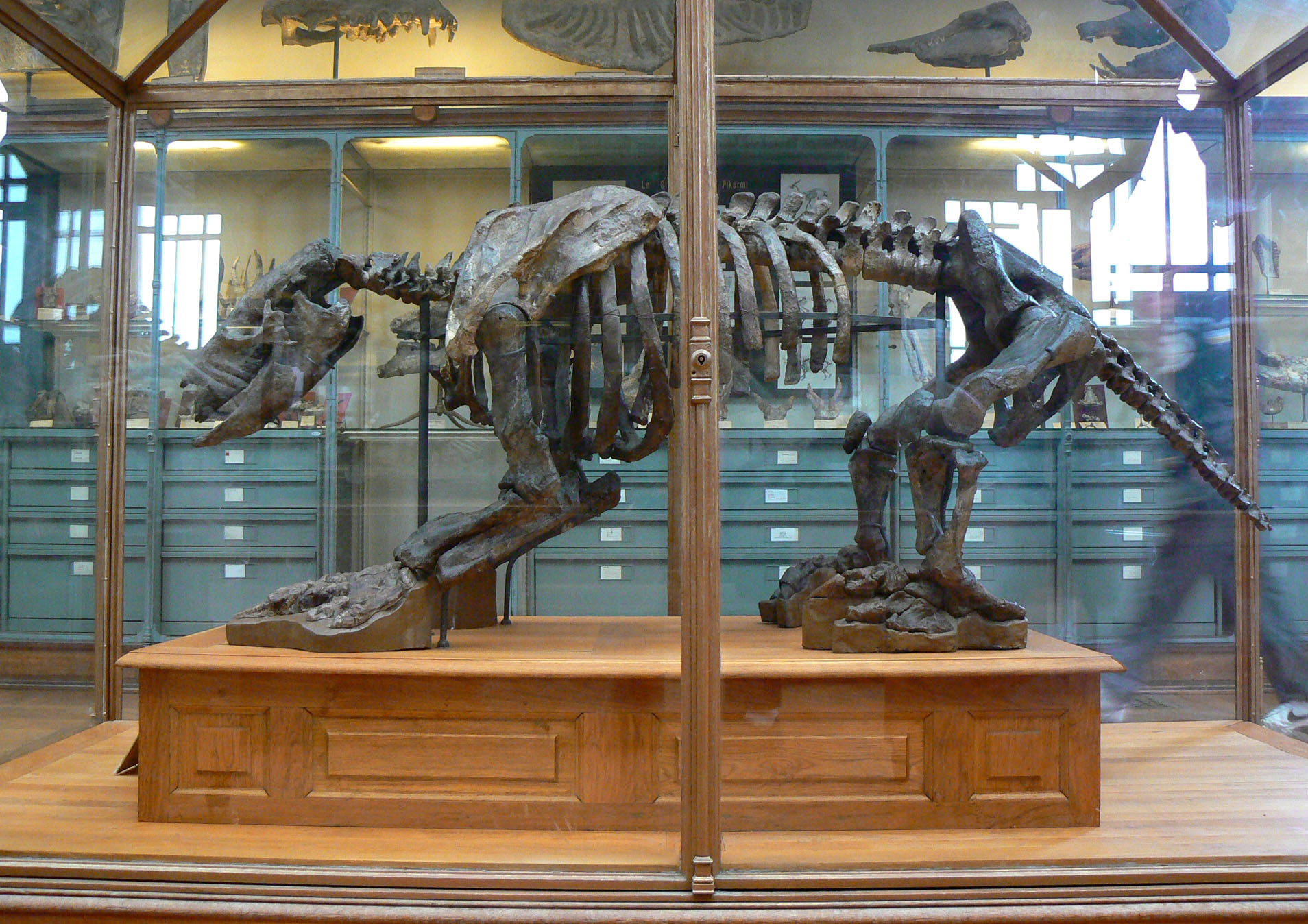
- S. leptocephalum Skeletal mount in the National Museum of Natural History (France)

Scientific classification
- Kingdom: Animalia
- Phylum: Chordata
- Class: Mammalia
- Order: Pilosa
- Suborder: Folivora
- Family: †Scelidotheriidae
- Genus: †Scelidotherium; Owen, 1840

Species
- †S. australis; †S. bravardi; †S. elegans; †S. laevidens; †S. leptocephalum Owen 1840; †S. modicum; †S. parodii Kraglievich 1923; †S. patrium; †S. pozzii; †S. reyesi; †S. tarijense

= Scelidotherium =

Scelidotherium Temporal range: ~3.3–0.012 Ma Late Pliocene - Late Pleistocene

Extinct genus of ground sloths

Scelidotherium is an extinct genus of ground sloth of the family Scelidotheriidae, endemic to South America during the Pliocene and Pleistocene epochs. It lived from 3,300,000 to 12,000 years ago, between the Chapadmalalan and Lujanian faunal stages of South America.

== Description ==
Life restoration of S. leptocephalum

It is characterized by an elongated, superficially anteater-like head. In fossil distribution, it is known from Argentina (Luján and Arroyo Seco Formations), Bolivia (Tarija Formation), Peru (San Sebastián Formation), Panama, Brazil, Paraguay and Ecuador.

In his journal of The Voyage of the Beagle, Charles Darwin reports the finding of a nearly perfect fossil Scelidotherium in Punta Alta while travelling overland from Bahía Blanca to Buenos Aires in 1832. He allied it to the Megatherium. Owen (1840) recognized the true characters of the remains and named them Scelidotherium, which means "femur beast" to reflect the distinctive proportions of that skeletal element. They were 1.1 metres (3.6 ft) tall and might have weighed up to 850 kg (1,870 lb).

== Taxonomy ==
Scelidotherium was named by Owen (1840). It was assigned to Mylodontidae by Carroll (1988); and to Scelidotheriinae by Gaudin (1995) and Zurita et al. (2004). Scelidotheriinae was elevated back to full family status by Presslee et al. (2019).

== Gallery ==
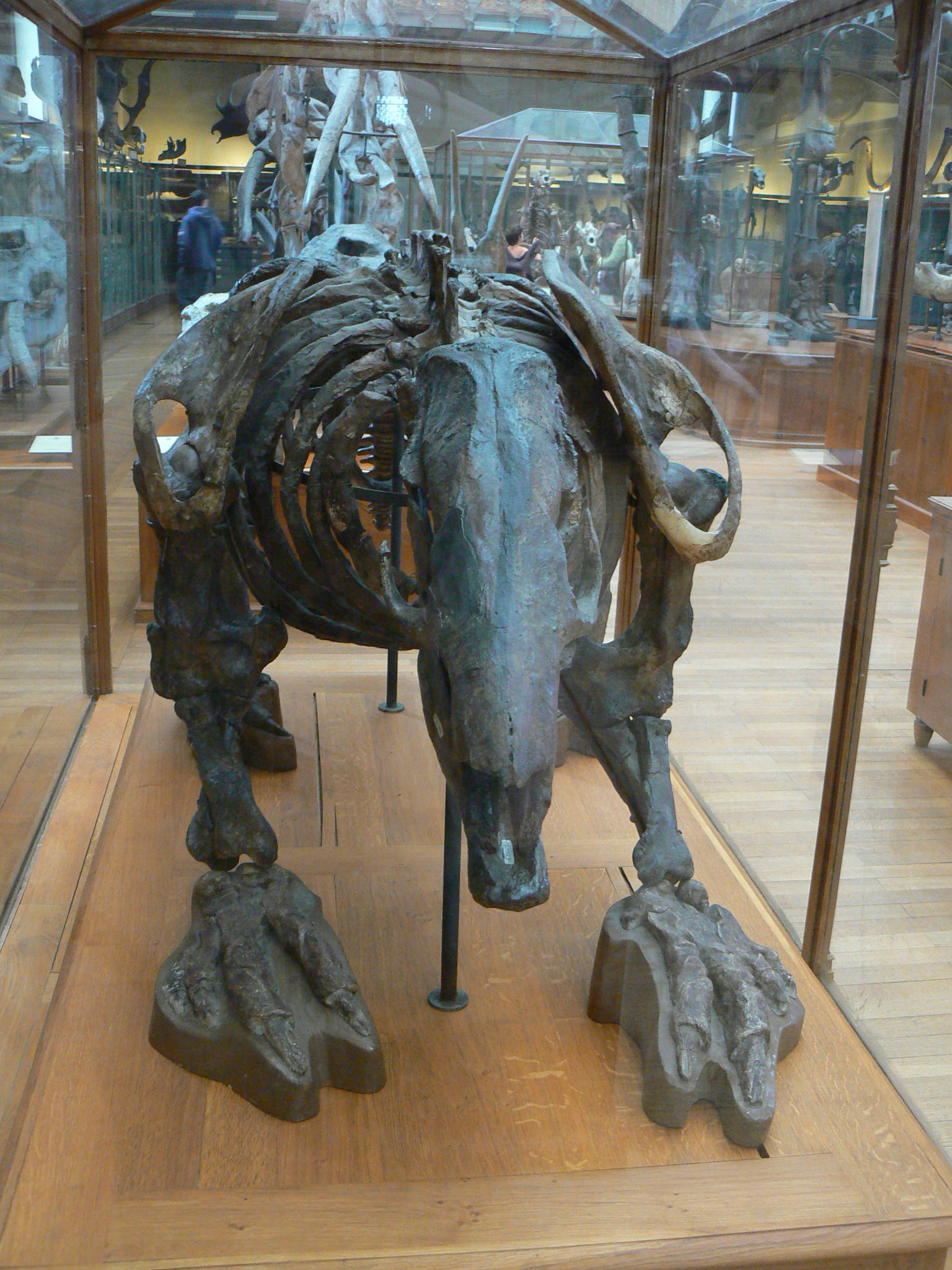
Front view of Scelidotherium leptocephalum skeleton

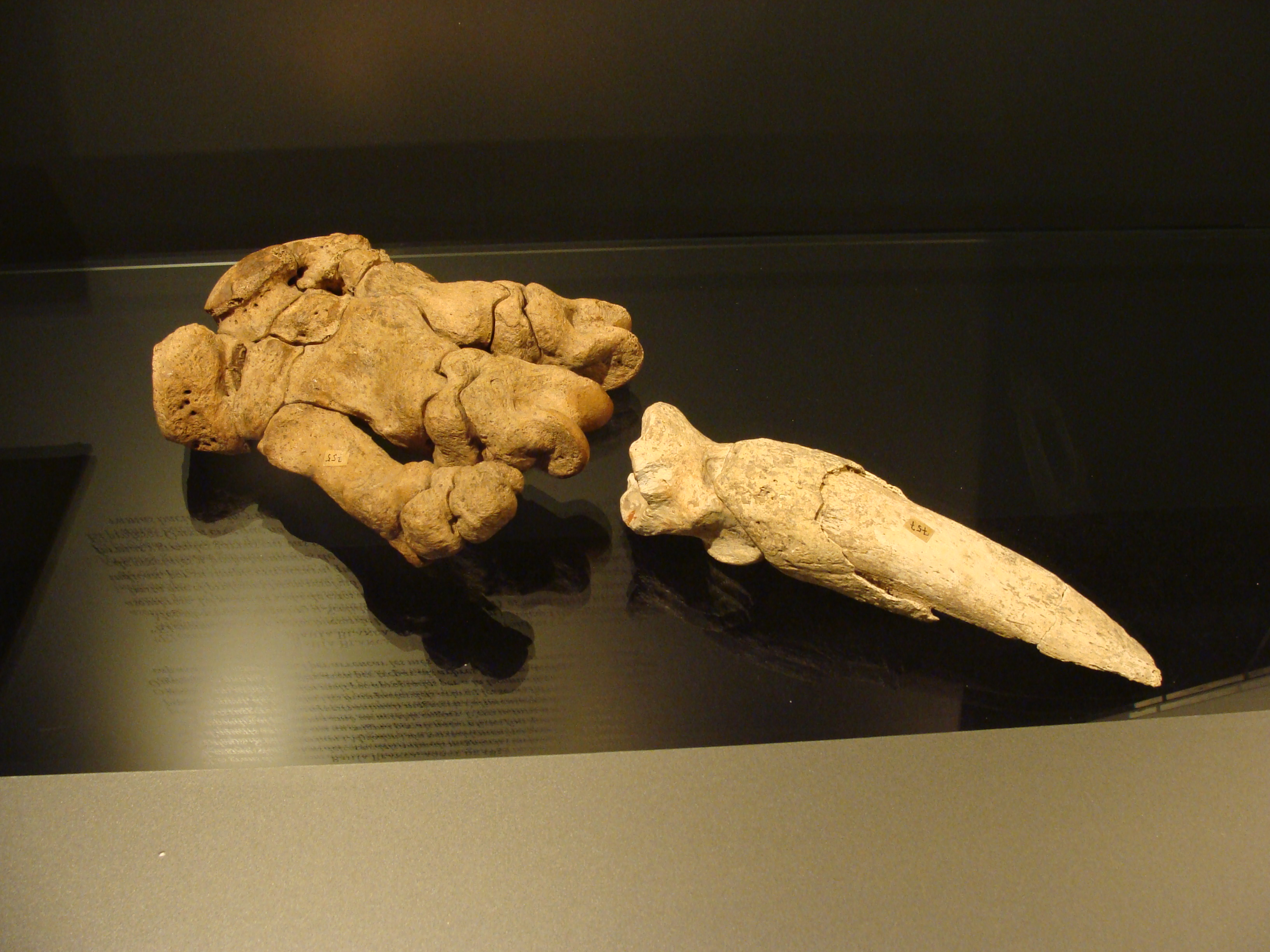
Scelidotherium sp. incomplete right hand

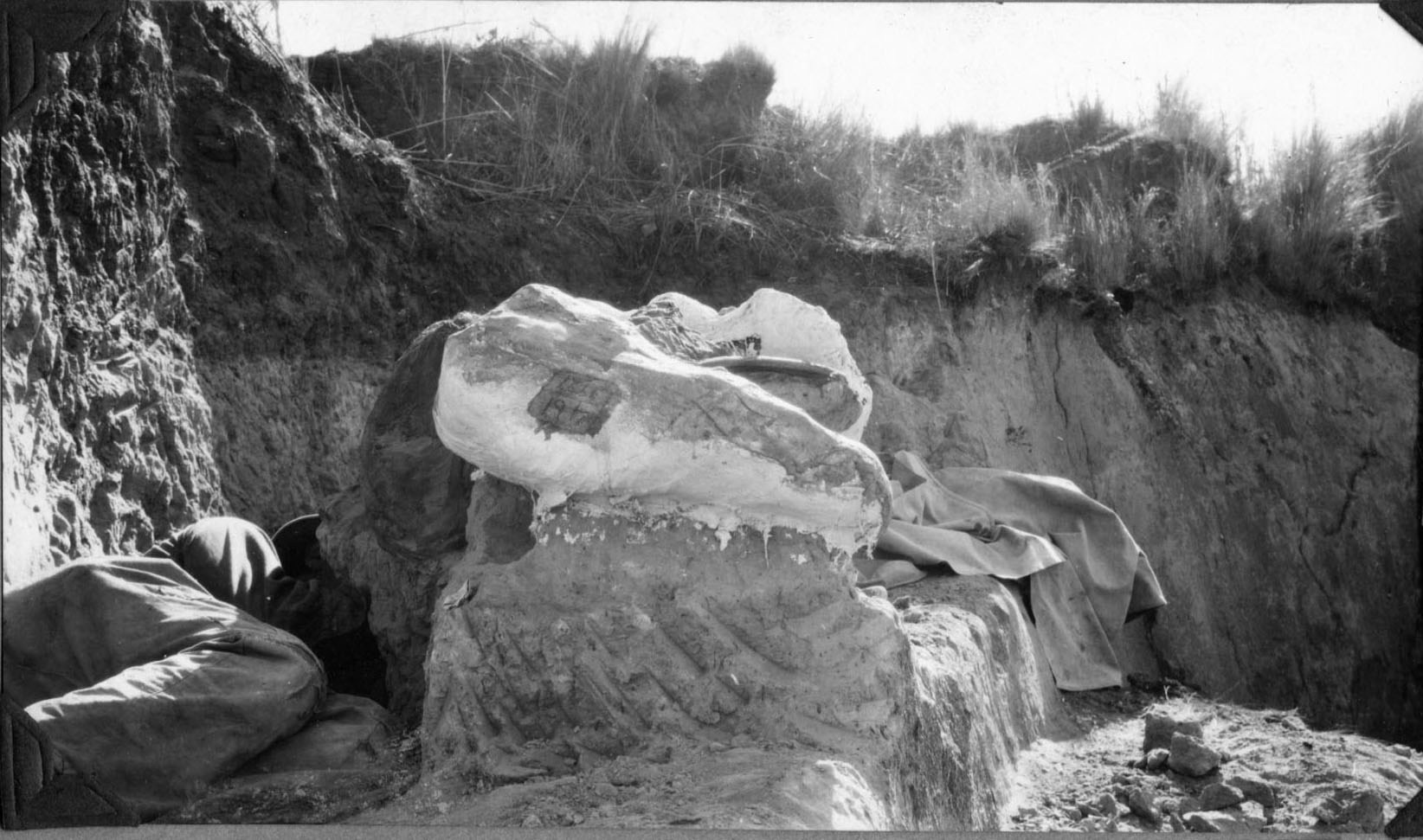
Scelidotherium skull in situ in plaster jacket, Argentina, 1926. Collected on the second Marshall Field Paleontological Expedition.
