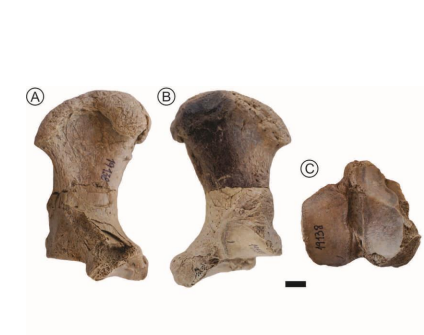
- Calcaneum of Prepoplanops boleadorensis

Scientific classification
- Kingdom: Animalia
- Phylum: Chordata
- Class: Mammalia
- Order: Pilosa
- Suborder: Folivora
- Family: †Megatheriidae
- Subfamily: †Planopsinae
- Genus: †Prepoplanops; Carlini et al. 2013
- Species: †P. boleadorensis

Binomial name
- †Prepoplanops boleadorensis Carlini et al. 2013

= Prepoplanops =

Prepoplanops Temporal range: Early Miocene (Santacrucian-Friasian) ~18.3–15.97 Ma

Extinct genus of ground sloths

Prepoplanops is an extinct genus of ground sloth of the family Megatheriidae. It lived in the Miocene around 18 to 16 million years ago of what is now Argentina. The only known species is Prepoplanops boleadorensis.

== Description ==
Prepoplanops was a medium-sized ground sloth, about 1.5 to 2 meters long.

== Classification ==
Prepoplanops was a representative of the Planopsinae, a subfamily of megatheriids that lived during the Miocene. In particular, it appears that Prepoplanops was an intermediate form between Planops and Prepotherium.

Prepoplanops boleadorensis was first described in 2013, based on fossil remains found in Argentina's Santa Cruz Province in the Cerro Boleadoras Formation.

Below is a phylogenetic tree of the Megatheriidae, based on the work of Varela and colleagues (2019).

- Megatheriidae
  - Megatheriinae
    - - - - - Eremotherium
            - Megatherium
          - Proeremotherium
        - Pyramiodontherium
      - Anisodontherium
    - - Diabolotherium
      - Megathericulus
  - Planopsinae
    - - Planops
      - Prepotherium
    - Prepoplanops
