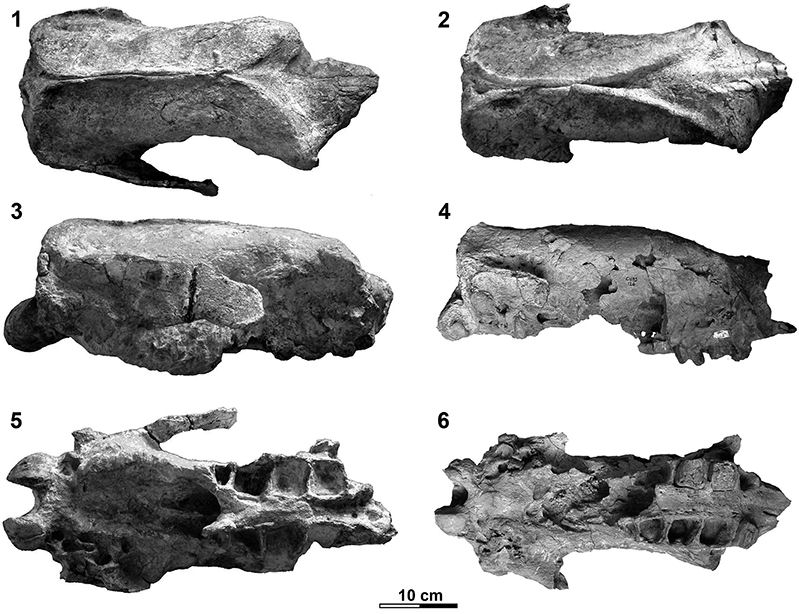
- Two skulls of Proeremotherium, holotype on the right

Scientific classification
- Kingdom: Animalia
- Phylum: Chordata
- Class: Mammalia
- Order: Pilosa
- Suborder: Folivora
- Family: †Megatheriidae
- Genus: †Proeremotherium; Carlini et al. 2006
- Species: †P. eljebe

Binomial name
- †Proeremotherium eljebe Carlini et al. 2006

= Proeremotherium =

Proeremotherium Temporal range: Late Miocene-Early Pliocene (Huayquerian-Chapadmalalan) ~5.333–3.588 Ma

Extinct genus of mammals

Proeremotherium is an extinct genus of megatheriine ground sloths in the family Megatheriidae. It lived during the Late Miocene and Early Pliocene of what is now Venezuela. So far, two largely complete skulls have been recovered in the Falcón Basin in Venezuela. The finds identify the animals as medium-sized representatives of the Megatheriidae. In the cranial anatomy, Proeremotherium resembles the later and giant Eremotherium. It is therefore assumed that the two ground sloths are directly related to each other.

== Etymology ==
The genus name, Proeremotherium, is derived from the Latin prefix pro- meaning "before", and the genus Eremotherium in reference to the assumed close relationship between the two genera. The specific name refers to the locality where the holotype was discovered, in the El Jebe Member of the Codore Formation.

== Description ==
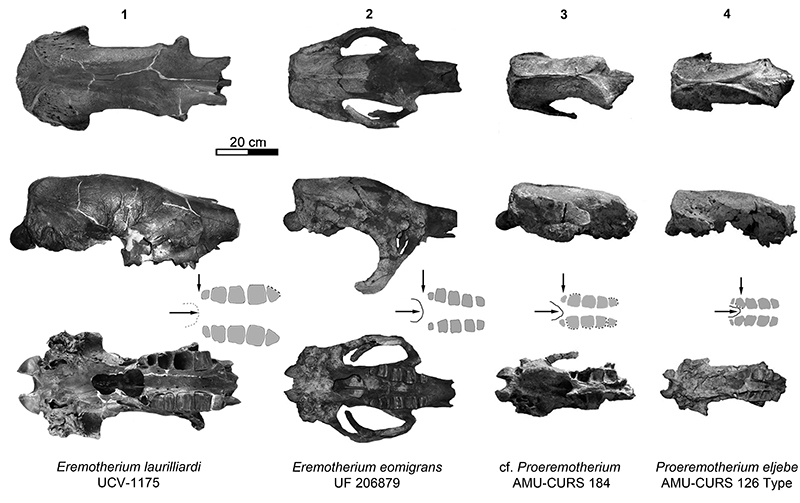
The two skulls of Proeremotherium (right) compared with those of Eremotherium (left); view from several angles; the outlines of the respective rows of teeth are shown in gray; the arrows indicate the posterior palatal foramen with outline, extent and location in relation to the teeth.

Proeremotherium was a medium-sized member of the Megatheriidae and significantly smaller than the related Eremotherium. So far, two almost complete skulls have been assigned the genus. These were 45.5 to 46.0 cm long and 16.0 to 16.8 cm wide in the area of the cranium. The skull was generally low and elongated in shape, with greatest width at the anterior and posterior bases of the zygomatic arch respectively. Compared to the sturdy skull of Megatherium, Proeremotherium had a skull that looked rather graceful. The forehead line was slightly arched in side view, which was particularly evident in the middle third. On the nasal bone there was a slight dent. When viewed from above, the rostrum was clearly triangular in shape, which is not known from any other representative of the Megatheriidae. A strong crest rose at the parietal bone . This started differently in the two skulls, on the one hand at the front and on the other hand at the rear zygomatic arch. In front, it resolved into two temporal lines that were straight or convex in shape. The occipital bone formed an angle of 90° as in Eremotherium, in Megatherium was much more blunt. The joint surfaces of the back of the head for connection with the cervical spine stood out prominently to the rear and were hemispherical in shape. Similar to Eremotherium, they sat relatively low on the skull just above the palate level, which differs from Megatherium or Pyramiodontherium with their high-set condyles, among other things . The base of the skull formed a plane with the palate, also in agreement with Eremotherium, but also with Megathericulus. In Megatherium, the former was higher, which was caused by the more high-crowned teeth. The anterior zygomatic arch was in the area of the secondmolar-like tooth. The anterior edge of the posterior palatal hole reached the fourth to fifth molar-like tooth in Proeremotherium, and continued further back in Eremotherium.

The teeth of Proeremotherium had the typical structure, as it is also known from other megatheriids. Each row of teeth consisted of five teeth at the top, which resembled molars in shape. Both rows ran more or less parallel to each other, the inner distance varied between 43 and 49 mm. The individual teeth of each row were close together, a diastema behind the first tooth was not formed in contrast to most other sloths. Typically, the teeth were square in outline except for the last, which was short and broad. The shape of the teeth corresponded to that of other derived megatheriids, in more primitive members such as Megathericulus they still had a rectangular outline. They showed the two sharp ridges perpendicular to the longitudinal axis of the tooth, which are characteristic of Megatheria, with a deep V-shaped indentation in between. The entire upper row of teeth reached a length of 16.9 cm, which corresponds to almost 37% of the skull length. The largest tooth was the third at 3.6 cm long and 3.2 cm wide.

== Discovery ==
Two Proeremotherium skulls are known from the Falcón Basin in northern Venezuela . In the Falcón Basin, an approximately 36,000 km² large depression, deposits of the Urumaco sequence are exposed, which date from the Lower Miocene to the Pliocene and thus cover a period of around 20 million years. The sediments can be assigned to three geological rock units, the Socorro, Urumaco and the Codore Formations. All three together form one of the most important fossil deposits in the northern South America from the Neogene . The first Proeremotherium skull discovered is from the Codore Formation about 1.5 km northwest of Cerro Chiguaje. The rock unit is composed of dark-colored, cross-bedded sandstones and lighter-colored limestones and was formed in the transition from the Upper Miocene to the Lower Pliocene about 6 million years ago. The deposits can be interpreted as the remains of a former river delta . Especially the lower layer member, the El Jebe Member, is fossiliferous. Among other things, remains of representatives of the Glyptodontinae and birds are documented here. Besides Proeremotherium another sloth, Bolivartherium, was also found here, but it belongs to the Mylodontidae. On the other hand, fossil evidence of Urumaquia, a member of the Megatheriidae comes from older deposits of the Urumaco sequence. Pseudoprepotherium, Magdalenabradys, Eionaletherium and Urumacotherium have also been documented, all representing mylodontids, while Urumacocnus and Pattersonocnus belong to the Megalonychidae. With regards to the sloths, the Urumaco sequence forms a fossil site with a high level of diversity, comparable to sites of the same age from southern South America, such as the Pampas region or Mesopotamia.

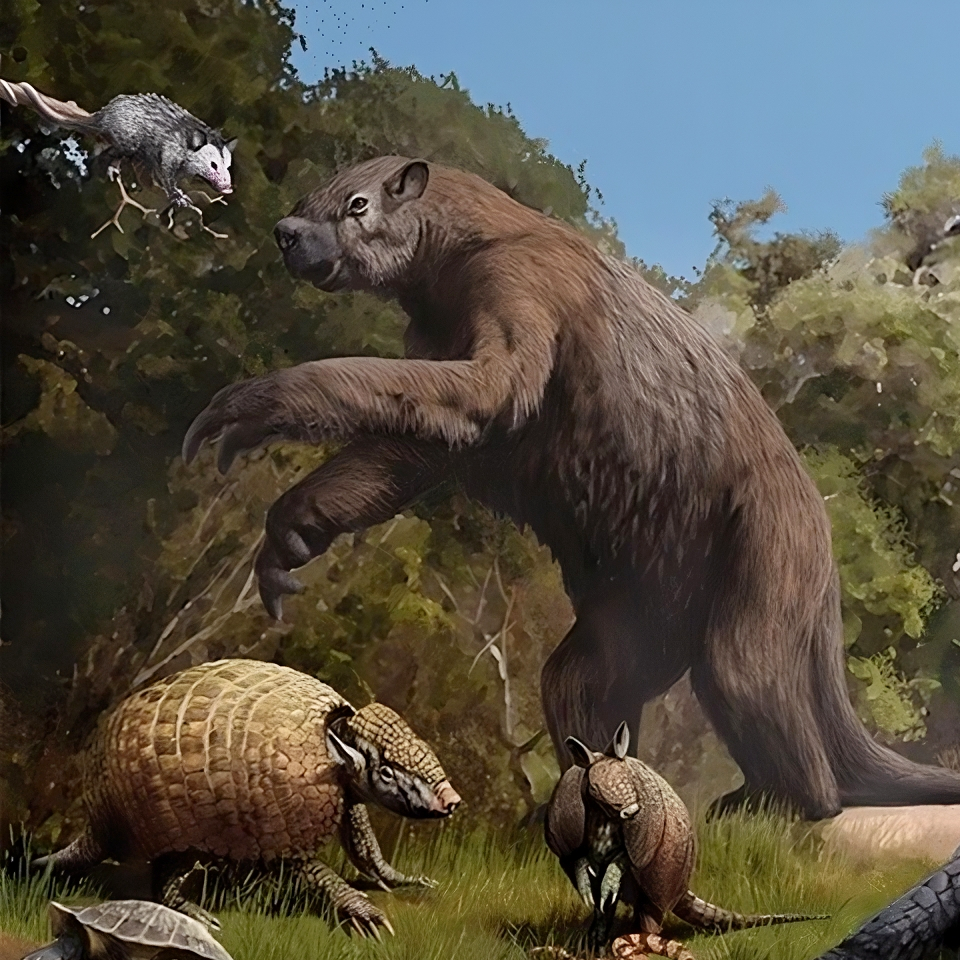
Paleofauna of the San Gregorio Formation, Venezuela

A second skull was discovered in the San Gregorio Formation 12 km north-northwest of the city of Urumaco. With a formation period from the Upper Pliocene to the Early Pleistocene, it no longer belongs to the Urumaco sequence. The main components of the rock unit are limestones with a small proportion of sandstones and conglomerates . It was created under tropical conditions in a savannah landscape interspersed with meandering rivers. Much of the fossil record of the San Gregorio Formation belongs to the Vergel Member attributed, which forms the oldest of a total of three layer members. In addition to the skull of the sloth genus, remains of rodents such as guinea pig relatives, but also armadillos, representatives of the Pampatheriidae and Glyptodontinae and South American ungulates were found here . Other faunal components are represented by crocodilians.

== Paleobiology ==
The two known skulls of Proeremotherium show individual variations, such as the course of the temporal lines or the length of the crown crest, but also the insertion of the zygomatic arch and the orientation of the joints of the occipital bone. At the moment, however, it cannot be said whether this is due to sexual dimorphism, different age stages or taxonomic deviations.

== Classification ==
Proeremotherium is a genus of the extinct Megatheriidae family from the suborder of sloths (Folivora). The group of sloths showed a high diversity of forms due to their phylogenetic past. Different lines of development can be distinguished within the sloths. The Megatheriidae thus form, together with the Megalonychidae and the Nothrotheriidae, a more closely related group, the superfamily of the Megatherioidea. Megatherioidea along with the Mylodontoidea are the two major lineages of sloths. This classic perspective is opposed to molecular genetic and protein-based investigations, which reveal an additional third lineage with the Megalocnoidea . According to the latter analyses, the Megatherioidea also include the three-toed sloths of the genus Bradypus and thus one of the two species of sloths that still exist today.

The genus Proeremotherium was first described in 2006 by Alfredo A. Carlini and research colleagues . The basis was the skull from the Codore Formation in the Falcón Basin of Venezuela, which thus acts as a holotype (specimen number AMU-CURS 126). The skull had already been mentioned two years earlier, but assigned to the genus Plesiomegatherium.

Below is a phylogenetic tree of the Megatheriidae, based on the work of Varela and colleagues (2019).

- Megatheriidae
  - Megatheriinae
    - - - - - Eremotherium
            - Megatherium
          - Proeremotherium
        - Pyramiodontherium
      - Anisodontherium
    - - Diabolotherium
      - Megathericulus
  - Planopsinae
    - - Planops
      - Prepotherium
    - Prepoplanops

== Palaeoecology ==
Proeremotherium lived in a tropical environment in an area of northern South America that was left relatively untouched by the Great American Interchange, the only non-native species of mammal known in the area of the Falcón Basin being the procyonid Cyonasua and Chapalmalania, and, potentially, a Camelidae still unassigned to a specific genus. Its environment was continental, an open, forested grassland area with rainforest elements, near freshwater. It coexisted with pampatheres such as Holmesina and Plaina, Proterotheriidae, the glyptodont Boreostemma, the Dasypodidae Pliodasypus and the notoungulate Falcontoxodon, as well as several species of caviomorph rodents such as Caviodon, Hydrochoeropsis, Marisela and Neoepiblema, and the crocodile Crocodylus falconensis.
