= Megathericulus =

Megathericulus Temporal range: Middle Miocene-Late Miocene (Friasian-Huayquerian) ~15.0–5.3 Ma

Scientific classification
- Kingdom: Animalia
- Phylum: Chordata
- Class: Mammalia
- Order: Pilosa
- Suborder: Folivora
- Family: †Megatheriidae
- Subfamily: †Megatheriinae
- Genus: †Megathericulus; Ameghino, 1904
- Species: †M. patagonicus

Binomial name
- †Megathericulus patagonicus Ameghino, 1904

Extinct genus of mammals

Megathericulus is an extinct genus of ground sloths in the Megatheriidae family. It lived during the Middle Miocene, 11-16 Ma in what is now South America. Fossils have been found principally in Argentina, Bolivia, and Peru. It is a smaller representative of the megatheres. Despite being one of the earliest-known members of the family, its dentition structure is associated with homodont teeth belonging to the more modern line of evolution. The genus was scientifically named in 1904. Only one species is currently recognized, Megathericulus patagonicus.

== Description ==
Megathericulus is a small member of the Megatheriidae. The known fossil material of the genus consists of individual skull, remains of teeth, and parts of the musculoskeletal system. The skull measured up to 33 cm in length, it was elongated and narrow with the greatest width in the area of the anterior zygomatic arch and the mastoid process and slight constrictions near the orbit. In its general shape it closely resembled the skulls of Planops or Pyramiodontherium, while that of Megatherium was significantly more robust. When viewed from the side, it had a low height. The forehead line was arched and sloping towards the rostrum. The latter was extremely elongated, with the front toothless area corresponding in extent to the tooth-bearing area. In later megatheriids, the anterior, toothless section was mostly shorter in proportion. The temporal fossae were prominent and converged toward the midline of the skull, but did not form a prominent crest. The infraorbital foramen opened approximately 2 cm above the alveolar plane. The anterior arch of the zygomatic arch attached between the second and third molar-like teeth, which is set somewhat further back than in Anisodontherium and Pyramiodontherium. The occiput was vertical, the joints for articulation with the cervical spine were slightly above the chewing plane of the maxillary teeth, approximately halfway up the skull. They were higher than in Anisodontherium and Pyramiodontherium but lower than in Megatherium. The palate extended through the extended snout like a spatula. It was very narrow and, with a width of 2.5 cm, did not exceed the dimensions of the tooth alveoli.

When viewed from the side, the lower jaw had a lower edge that clearly bulged downwards, which is considered a typical feature of megatheres. The deepest point and thus the greatest height of the horizontal bone body was reached under the third to fourth molar-like teeth. The position was significantly further back than in phylogenetically younger Megatheriums. The alveolar surface was slightly dented, which roughly corresponded to the ratio in Anisodontherium or Promegatherium, but differed from the straight course in Pyramiodontherium. The symphysis ended just short of the foremost molar-like tooth as in Anisodontherium, while in Pyramiodontherium and Pliomegatherium reached further back. The anterior edge of the ascending branch inserted at an obtuse angle to the alveolar plane of the horizontal body of bone. Below the anterior end of the ascending branch was the posterior opening of the mandibular canal.

The dentition of Megathericulus corresponded to that of the typical sloth with five teeth per upper jaw and four teeth per lower jaw. A total of 18 teeth were thus formed. The teeth of the upper jaw stood closed in parallel rows, but the outer edge made a slight curve. In the lower jaw, too, the teeth formed a closed row, and there was no lateral displacement of the first tooth, as is often observed in the representatives of the Mylodontidae and Megalonychidae. The teeth had the structure typical of the Megatheriidae. They were consistently molar-like in shape (molariform) and thus homodont, unlike most other sloths. The occlusal surfaces showed two sharp, transverse ridges separated by a V-shaped indentation. A special feature of Megathericulus is the extreme front and rear narrowing of the teeth, so that they appear very rectangular in cross section. This made the last upper tooth 0.7 cm long and 1.6 cm wide. Similarities to Anisodontherium can be seen in this feature, while the phylogenetically younger forms in particular had more square to trapezoidal tooth cross-sections. In accordance with most megatheres, the teeth were very high-crowned (hypsodont), which also explains the special shape of the lower jaw with the bulge of the lower edge. The hypsodonty index (ratio of the height of the horizontal bony body of the mandible to the length of the row of teeth) for Megathericulus was 0.92 and thus indicates an average value for Megatheria (Megatheriops and Pyramiodontherium below 0.9, Megatherium and Anisodontherium above 1.0). The length of the upper row of teeth was about 8 cm.

Parts of the front and hind legs are documented from the body skeleton. The humerus was 36 to 38 cm long and generally slim. The large and small bony prominences on the head (tuberculum majus and tuberculum minus) reached large dimensions. A strong and extensive deltopectoral ridge ran along the shaft, which no longer appears clearly in later megatherias. The humerus widened considerably downwards and measured between 13.6 and 16.2 cm at the end of the joint (elbow joint). The ratio of the lower width to the total length of the bone thus corresponded approximately to that of Megatherium and was significantly larger than in Pyramiodontherium and Megatheriops. Most of the other long bones are, with exceptions, only fragmented. The ulna was characterized by a rather short and narrow upper articular process (olecranon). In the first aspect, this agrees with other megatheriines, the latter is different from the mostly wide olecranon of the other members of the family. As in almost all megatheriids, but unlike other sloths, the lower end of the tibia and fibula were fused together. The shin itself measured about 28 cm in length and was also slender. It broadly corresponded to that of Pyramiodontherium. Based on the joint facets on the second metacarpal that has been handed downward it can be concluded that a metacarpal-carpal complex (MCC) was also formed in Megathericulus. This consisted of the fused first metacarpal and the large polygonal bone and is a typical feature of megatheriids and some other large ground sloths.

== Fossil finds ==
Megathericulus was documented by numerous finds from southern parts of South America. The fossil remains determining the genus came from near Laguna Blanca in the Argentine province of Chubut. They consisted of an anterior skull fragment missing teeth and a complete right talus. The finds were generally assigned to the Middle Miocene. Other finds were documented in western Chubut, including a left mandibular branch and also a right ankle bone from the Collón Curá Formation. Their absolute age was determined with the help of radiometric dating to 15.8 to 11.2 Ma. In the Río Mayo Formation, numerous fragmented remains were recovered, including parts of the lower jaw and various elements of the musculoskeletal system. The fossils came from two different find sites and each represented a single individual per locality, which could be deduced from the matching sizes and preservation states. They were somewhat younger than the finds from the Collón-Curá Formation, based on the dating of a prominent horizon below the fossil-bearing strata to about 11.8 Ma.

Outside of Argentina, Megathericulus has been reported from Bolivia, among other places. This includes at the rich fossil site, Quebrada Honda, Tarija, Bolivia. The site was discovered in the 1970s and has been continuously researched since then. The absolute ages of the extensive find region range from 13 to 12 Ma. A partial skeleton of Megathericulus consisting of a complete skull without the lower jaw and remains of the forelimb was found in an outcrop on the north bank of the Río Rosario. A layer of tuff worked into the fossil-bearing strata gave an age of 12.4 Ma. The finds here were assigned to the Papachacra local fauna. Another remnant, a humerus, was found in an outcrop further south and belonged to the Huayllajara local fauna. Particularly noteworthy is also a toothless lower jaw from the Río Sepa, a tributary of the Río Urubamba in the Peruvian part of the Amazon region. The find fit into a very rich faunal community known as the Fitzcarrald local fauna, ranging in age from 17 to 10 Ma. The deposits in which the fossils were embedded date back to what was once a large wetland of swamps, lakes and rivers that drained north into the Caribbean Sea. As the Pebas megawetland, they represent the forerunner of today's Amazon rainforest. The lower jaw find itself was given as being 13.5 to 11.8 Ma.

== Classification ==
Megathericulus is a member of the extinct family Megatheriidae within the suborder of sloths (Folivora). The currently poorly-known group of sloths showed a high variety of forms in their phylogenetic past. Different lines of development can be distinguished within the sloths. In a classical system based on skeletal anatomical features, the Megatheriidae, together with the Megalonychidae and the Nothrotheriidae, form a more closely related group, the superfamily of the Megatherioidea. According to molecular genetic studies and protein analysis, the Bradypodidae which only includes the extant three-toed sloths (Bradypus) are also included.

The Megatheriidae produced the largest known representatives of sloths, including the eponymous Megatherium and Eremotherium. Both are mainly known from the Pleistocene, the former was limited to the Pampas and Andes region of South America, the latter reached in the course of the Great American Interchange the southern part of North America. Megathericulus is considered a basal form of the phylogenetically more modern branch of the Megatheriidae, which are summarized in the subfamily of the Megatheriinae and also includes the aforementioned Eremotherium and Megatherium. Evidence of this can be found above all in the tooth morphology with the consistently homodontic, molar-like teeth. In the original Megatheriidae from the subfamily Planopinae the front teeth are still shaped like a canine. The genus Megathericulus was scientifically first described in 1904 by Florentino Ameghino. He used an edentulous front part of a skull and a right ankle bone. The type locality was Ameghino Tehuelche antiguo del Chubut (Laguna Blanca), which is located in today's Argentine province of Chubut. He named M. patagonicus as the only species, with the species epithet referring to the larger fine landscape of Patagonia. In 1939, Ángel Cabrera named the species M. primaevus using individual postcranial skeletal parts (ribs, ulna, tibia, talus, and heel bone) from the Cañadon Ftamichi near Paso Flores in the Argentine province of Río Negro. These remains come from the Collón Curá Formation, but were dated by Cabrera to a somewhat older age (beginning of the Middle Miocene). Some later authors did not see the attribution of the material to Megathericulus and thus to the Megatheriinae as unambiguous. Other new find material from the Collón Curá Formation did not differ from corresponding finds from M. patagonicus, leading to the equivalence of Cabrera's species with Ameghino's nominate form in 2019. Another species had already been established in 1930 by Lucas Kraglievich with M. friasensis, citing a partial skull from the Río Frias in Chile, but according to most authors it is a representative of the Scelidotheriidae, which in turn belong to the Mylodontidae family. In 2013, a research team led by François Pujos referred M. cabrerai and M. andinum to Megathericulus, two species originally in the genus Eomegatherium stood. Both also go back to Kraglievich 1930. For the description he used individual, severely dismembered skull parts and some long bone fragments from Patagonia. Due to the clearly fragmented state of the finds, other scientists consider an assignment to Megathericulus implausible and keep the two species within Eomegatherium for the time being since better find material would be required for a more precise and clearer assignment. Accordingly, for the time being M. patagonicus remains the only species of the genus Megathericulus.

Below is a phylogenetic tree of the Megatheriidae, based on the work of Varela et al. 2019, showing the position of Megathericulus.

- Megatheriidae
  - Megatheriinae
    - - - - - Eremotherium
            - Megatherium
          - Proeremotherium
        - Pyramiodontherium
      - Anisodontherium
    - - Diabolotherium
      - Megathericulus
  - Planopsinae
    - - Planops
      - Prepotherium
    - Prepoplanops
