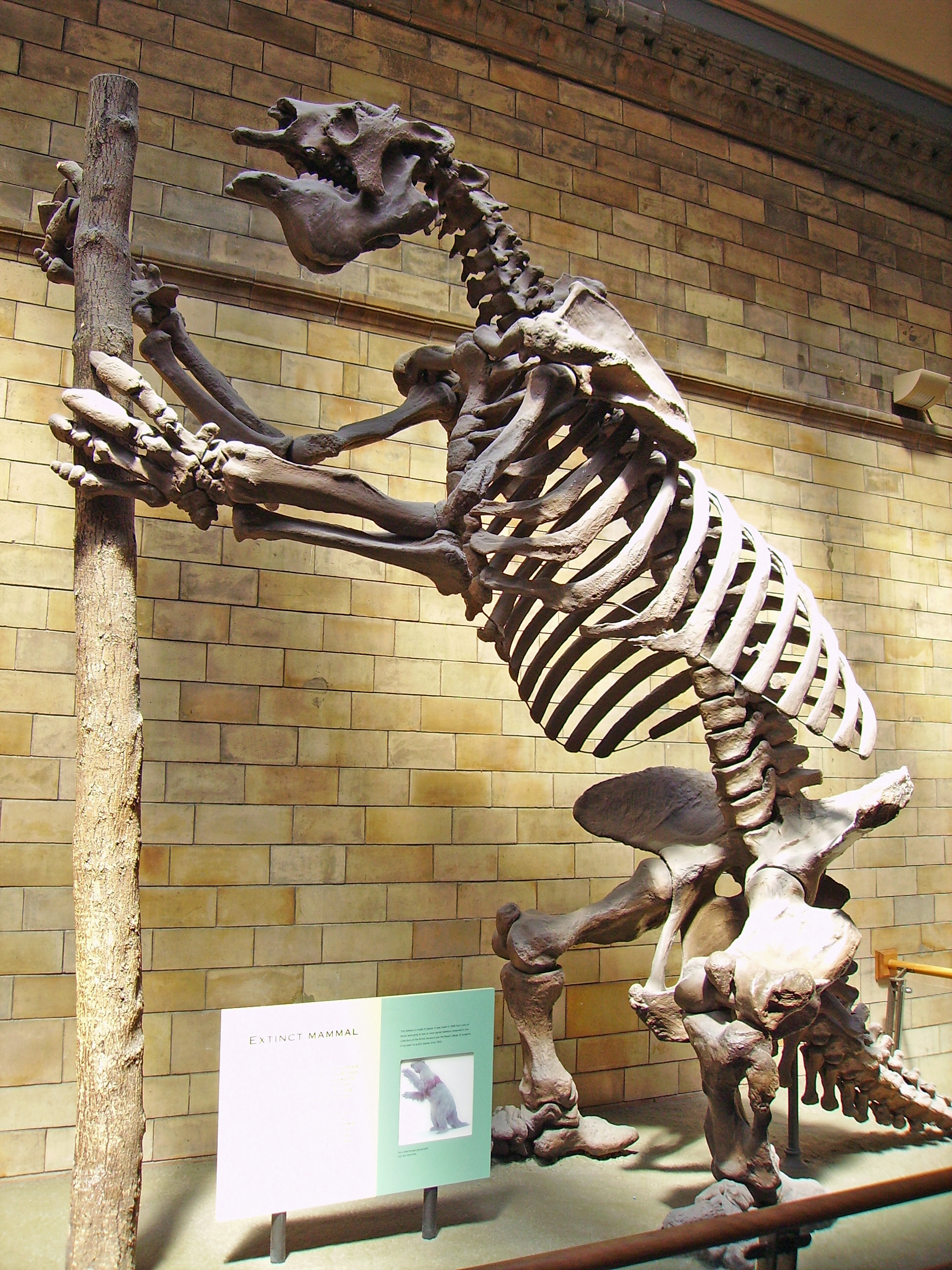
- Megatherium americanum skeleton, Natural History Museum, London

Scientific classification
- Kingdom: Animalia
- Phylum: Chordata
- Class: Mammalia
- Order: Pilosa
- Family: †Megatheriidae
- Subfamily: †Megatheriinae; Gill, 1872

Genera
- †Anisodontherium; †Diabolotherium; †Eomegatherium; †Eremotherium; †Megathericulus; †Megatheridium; †Megatheriops; †Megatherium; †Ocnopus; †Perezfontanatherium; †Plesiomegatherium; †Pliomegatherium; †Proeremotherium; †Promegatherium; †Pyramiodontherium; †Sibotherium; †Urumaquia

= Megatheriinae =

Megatheriinae Temporal range: Early Miocene to Early Holocene (Hemphillian-Rancholabrean (NALMA) & Santacrucian-Lujanian) (SALMA)17.5–0.010 Ma

Extinct subfamily of mammals

Megatheriinae is a subfamily of the Megatheriidae, an extinct family of ground sloths that lived from the Middle Miocene to the Early Holocene.

== Classification ==
Within the Megatheriidae there are two (possibly three) subfamilies; the Megatheriinae and the Planopsinae. The phylogenetically older group is represented by the Planopsinae from the Lower and Middle Miocene. These still possessed a caniniform anterior tooth, which was separated from the posterior molar-like teeth by a small diastema . The more derived Megatheriinae, which are known from the Middle Miocene to the Early Holocene, on the other hand, had fully homodontic molars in a closed row. Originally, the subfamilies of the Nothrotheriinae and the Schismotheriinae were also placed in the Megatheriidae. Based on skull studies, the Nothrotheriidae, in which, among other genera, Nothrotherium, Nothrotheriops, and the semiaquatic Thalassocnus are placed, are regarded as a separate family, which forms the sister group of the Megatheriidae.

- Megatheriidae
  - Planopsinae
    - Prepoplanops
    - - Planops
      - Prepotherium
  - Megatheriinae
    - - Diabolotherium
      - Megathericulus
    - - Anisodontherium
      - - Pyramiodontherium
        - - Proeremotherium
          - - Eremotherium
            - Megatherium
