= Sibotherium =

Sibotherium Temporal range: Late Miocene (Hemphillian) ~5.8 Ma

Scientific classification
- Kingdom: Animalia
- Phylum: Chordata
- Class: Mammalia
- Order: Pilosa
- Family: †Megatheriidae
- Genus: †Sibotherium; Rincón et al., 2020
- Species: †S. ka

Binomial name
- †Sibotherium ka Rincón et al., 2020

Extinct genus of ground sloths

Sibotherium is an extinct genus of ground sloth in the family Megatheriidae that lived in what is now Costa Rica during the Late Miocene. It was a large ground sloth, weighing more than 2,500 kg.

== Discovery ==
Fossils of Sibotherium have been found in the Curré Formation in the Puntarenas Province of Costa Rica. The finds are 5.8 million years old and date to the Late Hemphillian, falling within the Late Miocene. The holotype is a left ankle bone. Skeletal parts of some individuals of Sibotherium have also been found, namely partial mandibles, molars, a collarbone and parts of the legs, hands and feet.

== Etymology ==
The genus name, Sibotherium is derived from Sibö, the good creator in Bribri mythology, and therion, Greek for "beast". In the beginning Sibö made the Earth, the land, the animals and the plants according to the myths of the Bribri, the original inhabitants of southern Costa Rica. This name was chosen because Sibotherium was one of the first South American migrants to shape the new faunal composition of Central America. The species name refers to the Bribri word Ká, which means "place".

== Classification ==
Within the family Megatheriidae, Sibotherium belongs to the subfamily Megatheriinae. Sibotherium occupies a basal position within this subfamily and Sibotherium is most closely related to Megathericulus, Pyramiodontherium and Anisodontherium.

Sibotherium is the oldest known representative of the Megatheriidae that occurred outside of South America and lived in southern Central America at a time when the Panamanian isthmus was not yet closed, leaving a strait between southern Central America and northwestern Central America. It is believed that Sibotherium or its ancestor reached southern Central America over a temporary land bridge during a period of sea level decline, tectonic rise or a combination of both.
