= Curré Formation =

Geologic formation in Costa Rica

- Stratigraphic range: Hemphillian; ~10.3–4.9 Ma
- Type: Formation
- Unit of: Taraba Basin Group
- Underlies: El Brujo & La Cruz Formations
- Overlies: Térraba Formation

Lithology
- Primary: Conglomerate

Location
- Coordinates: 8.9°N 83.1°W
- Approximate paleocoordinates: 8.8°N 83.1°W
- Region: Limón & Puntarenas Provinces
- Country: Costa Rica
- Extent: Taraba Basin

Type section
- Named for: Rey Curré
- Curré Formation (Costa Rica)

The Curré Formation is a geologic formation of the Taraba Basin Group in Costa Rica. The deltaic conglomerates preserve fossils dating back to the Late Miocene to Early Pliocene period (Hemphillian).

== Fossil content ==
The following fossils have been found in the formation:

- Aetobatus arcuatus
- Calippus hondurensis
- Carcharhinus longimanus, C. priscus
- Dasyatis cavernosa
- Dinohippus mexicanus
- Gavialosuchus americana
- Hemipristis serra
- Isogomphodon acuarius, I. caunellensis
- Isurus desorii
- Pleiolama vera
- Pliometanastes cf. protistus
- Protohippus gidleyi
- Rhynchotherium blicki
- Scirrotherium antelucanus
- Sibotherium ka
- Sphyrna arambourgi
- Apalone sp.
- Arius sp.
- Eurhinodelphis sp.
- Goniodelphis sp.
- Hadrodelphis sp.
- Myliobatis sp.
- Orycterocetus sp.
- Rhinoptera sp.
- Sparus sp.
- Emydinae indet.
- Megatheriidae indet.
- Mylodontidae indet.
- Tayassuidae indet.

== See also ==
- List of fossiliferous stratigraphic units in Costa Rica
