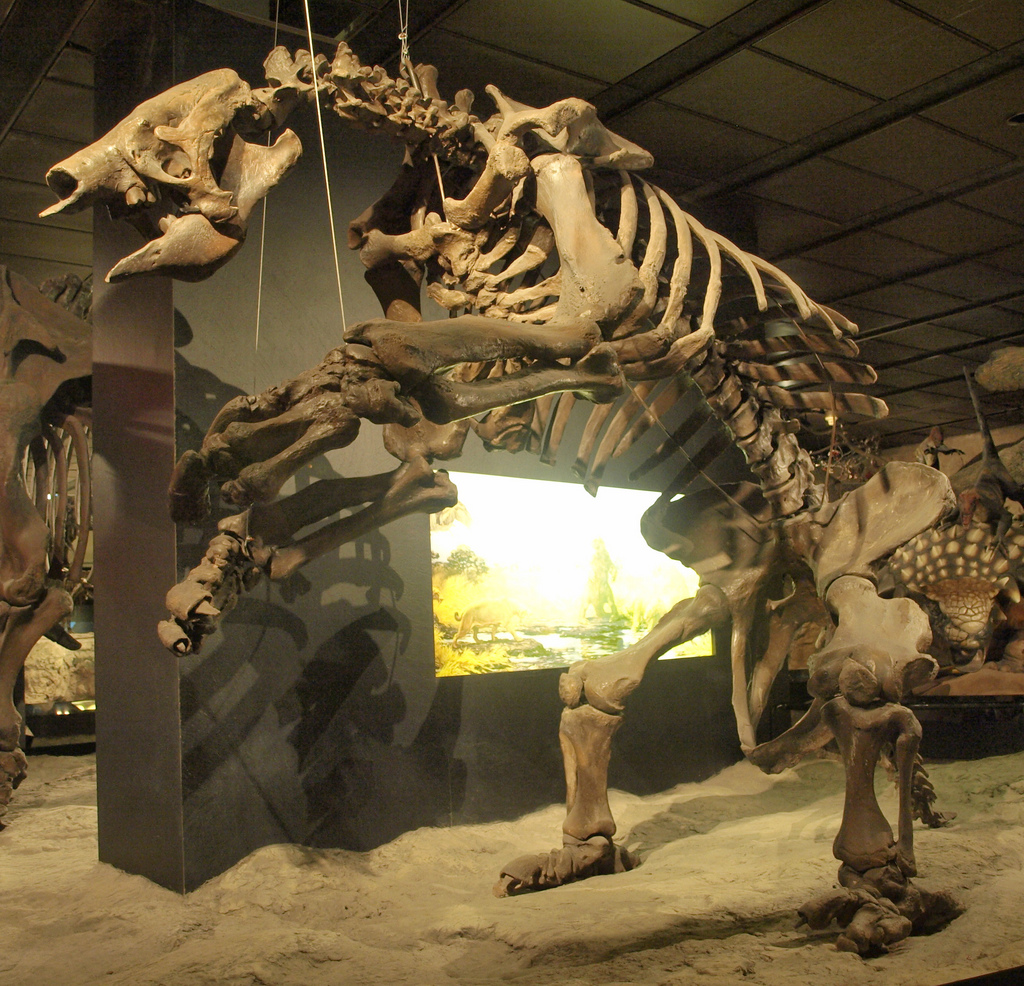
- E. laurillardi at the HMNS

Scientific classification
- Kingdom: Animalia
- Phylum: Chordata
- Class: Mammalia
- Order: Pilosa
- Suborder: Folivora
- Clade: †Megatheria
- Family: †Megatheriidae
- Subfamily: †Megatheriinae
- Genus: †Eremotherium; Spillmann, 1948

Type species
- †Eremotherium laurillardi Lund, 1842

Other species
- E. eomigrans De Iullis & Cartelle 1999; E. sefvei De Iullis & Cartelle 1997
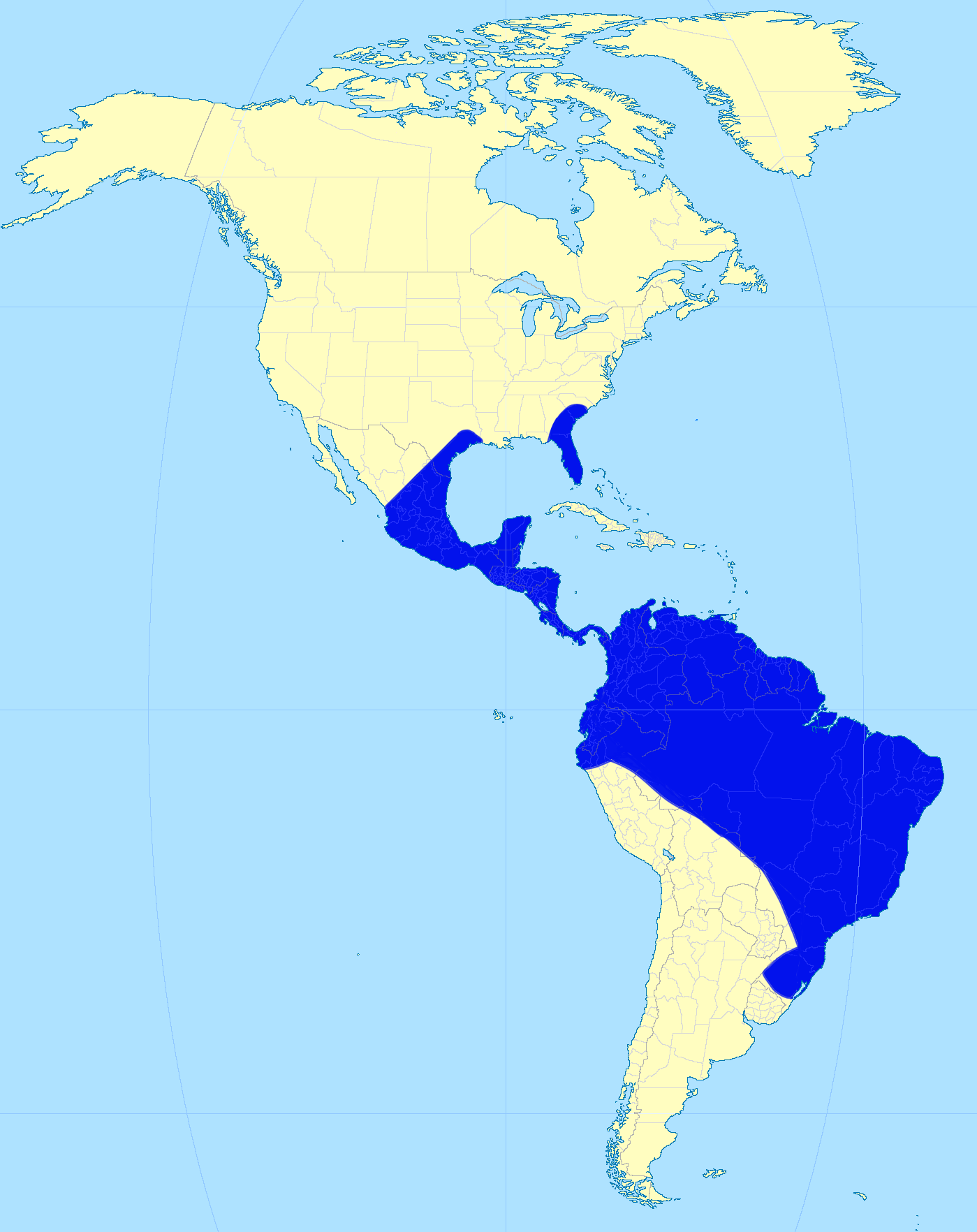
- Range of Eremotherium

= Eremotherium =

Eremotherium Temporal range: ~4.9–0.0061 Ma Early Pliocene - Middle Holocene

Extinct genus of giant ground sloth

Eremotherium (from Greek for "steppe" or "desert" "beast": ἔρημος "steppe or desert" and θηρίον "beast") is an extinct genus of giant ground sloth in the family Megatheriidae. Eremotherium lived in southern North America, Central America, and northern South America. It was one of the largest sloths, with a body size comparable to elephants, weighing around 4.5 tonnes (4.4 long tons; 5.0 short tons) and measuring about 6 metres (20 ft) long, slightly larger than its close relative Megatherium.

Originating during the Pliocene, Eremotherium migrated northwards into North America as part of the Great American Interchange of fauna between North and South America following the emergence of the Isthmus of Panama during the late Pliocene. Finds of Eremotherium are common and widespread, with fossils being found as far north as South Carolina (with a single record also reported from New Jersey) in the United States and as far south as Rio Grande Do Sul in southern Brazil, and many complete skeletons have been unearthed.

Eremotherium was widespread in tropical and subtropical lowlands and lived there in partly open and closed landscapes, while its close relative Megatherium lived in more temperate climes of South America. Characteristic of Eremotherium was its robust physique with comparatively long limbs and front and hind feet especially for later representatives. However, the skull is relatively gracile, the teeth are uniform and high-crowned. Like today's sloths, Eremotherium was purely herbivorous and was probably a mixed feeder that dined on leaves and grasses that adapted its diet to local environments and climates. Like Megatherium, Eremotherium is suggested to have been capable of adopting a bipedal posture to feed on high-growing leaves.

Only two valid species are known, Eremotherium laurillardi and E. eomigrans, the former was named by prolific Danish paleontologist Peter Lund in 1842 based on a tooth of a juvenile individual that had been collected from Pleistocene deposits in caves in Lagoa Santa, Brazil alongside fossils of thousands of other megafauna. Lund originally named it as a species of its relative Megatherium, though Austrian paleontologist Franz Spillman later created the genus name Eremotherium after noticing its distinctness from other megatheriids.

Eremotherium became extinct at the end of the Late Pleistocene as part of the end-Pleistocene extinction event, alongside other ground sloths and most large mammals across the Americas, though some specimens potentially suggest that Eremotherium might have lived up to the early-middle Holocene. The extinction of Eremotherium and other megafauna post-dates human arrival in the Americas, who may have contributed to the extinctions. Some potential, but not definitive evidence has been found for the interaction between humans and Eremotherium remains. Some potential early-middle Holocene records of Eremotherium have been reported from Brazil.

== History and naming ==
The taxonomic history of Eremotherium largely involves it being confused with Megatherium and the naming of many additional species that are actually synonymous with E. laurillardi. For many years fossils from the genus have been known, with records from as early as 1823 when fossil collectors J. P. Scriven and Joseph C. Habersham collected several teeth, skull, and mandible fragments, including a nearly complete set of mandibles, from Quaternary age deposits in Skidaway Island, Georgia in the United States. In 1852, American paleontologist Joseph Leidy named Megatherium mirabile based on the fossils (specimen numbers USNM 825-832 + 837), although it is now considered a synonym of Eremotherium laurillardi. The first discovery to be published was in 1824, two teeth fragments from Skidaway Island were referred to Megatherium by Dr. Samuel L. Mitchell. In 1824, American naturalist William Cooper described 20 additional remains that were later deposited at the Lyceum of Natural History. These fossils were also collected by Joseph C. Habersham.

Several other discoveries from Georgia and South Carolina were described as Megatherium throughout the 1840s and 1850s, like in 1846 when Savannah scholar William B. Hodgson described some "Megatherium" fossils from Georgia that had been donated by Habersham, including portions of several skulls. These were all described in more detail by Joseph Leidy in 1855, but they were not all referred to Eremotherium until the late 20th century. In 1842, Richard Harlan named a new species of the turtle Chelonia, Chelonia couperi, based on a supposed femur, or thigh bone, that had been found in the Brunswick Canal in Glynn County, Georgia and dated to the Pleistocene. It was not until 1977 that further analysis demonstrated that the "femur" was actually a clavicle from Eremotherium. It is unknown, which publication was published first - according to the regulations of the ICZN, the species name of the first publication would have priority, even if it was attached to another genus - but the species name E. couperi is rarely used, while E. laurillardi is more widely used and has been adopted by more scientists.

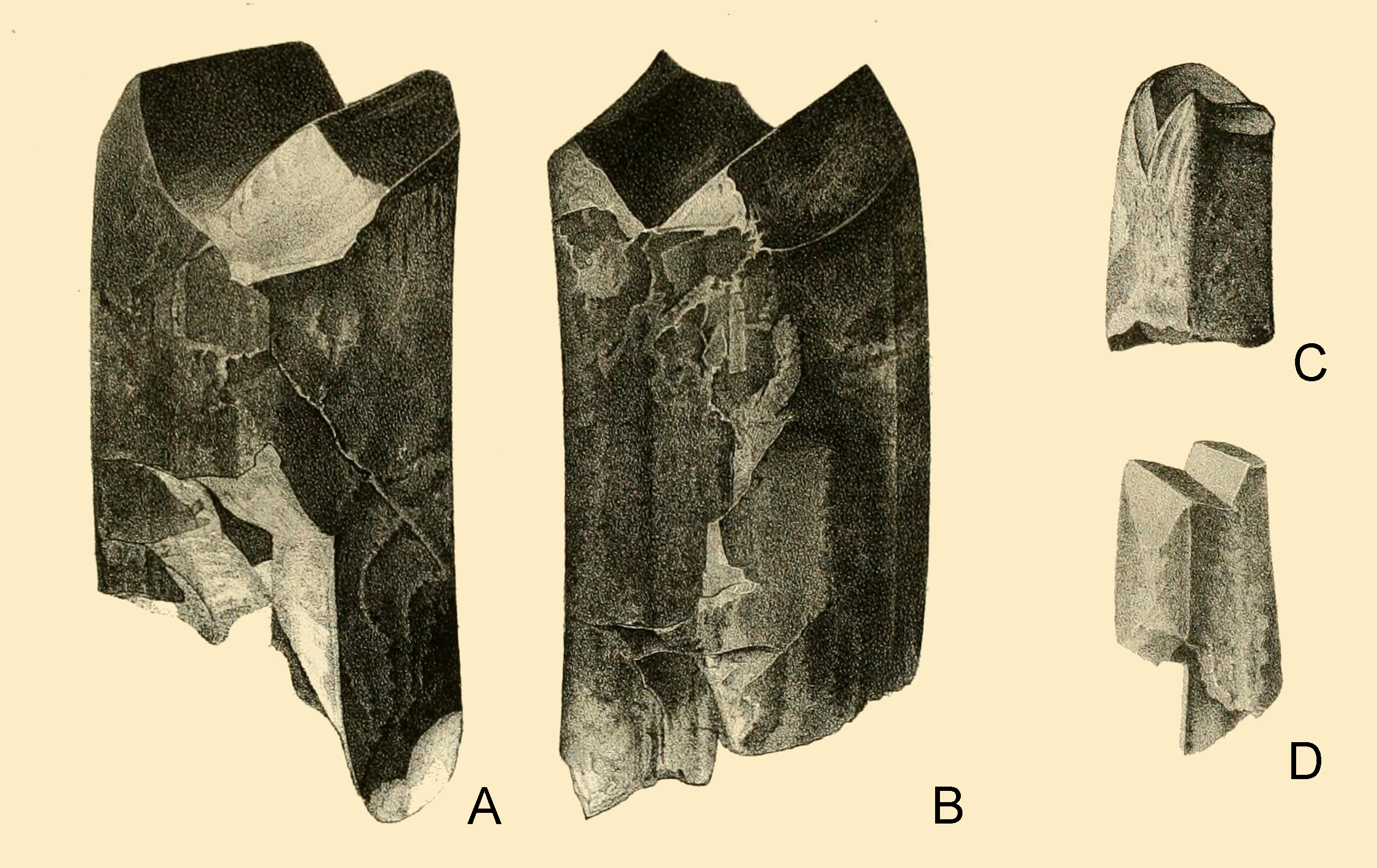
The type teeth of E. laurillardi as figured by Lund (1842). A & B are from an adult, while C & D are from a juvenile.

Fossils from South America were first described by Danish paleontologist and founder of Brazilian paleontology Peter Wilhelm Lund when he established a new species of Megatherium based on two teeth (specimen number ZMUC 1130 and 1131) from Lapa Vermella, a cave in the valley of the Rio de la Velhas in the Brazilian state of Minas Gerais under the name Megatherium laurillardi, the first named species now assigned to Eremotherium. Lund diagnosed the species based on the size of the teeth, which were only a quarter the size of Megatherium americanum, the greatest representative of Megatherium, and he believed that it was a tapir-sized animal. Today, the teeth are considered to be from a juvenile of E. laurillardi and adults reached or exceeded the size of M. americanum. Two years earlier, Lund had already figured teeth found at Lapa Vermella, which he assigned to Megatherium americanum due to their dimensions, which he figured alongside those of M. laurillardi in the 1842 publication. They also have been referred to Eremotherium laurillardi. For many years, E. laurillardi's holotype was speculated to actually have come from a dwarf species of Eremotherium while the larger fossils belonged to another distinct species like E. rusconii, a species that was erected by Samuel Schaub in 1935 for giant fossils from Venezuela, though it was initially thought to be a species of Megatherium. However, this view is mostly contradicted and argues that at least in the Late Pleistocene in South and North America there was only a single species, E. laurillardi, which had a strong sexual dimorphism. Discoveries of extensive material of Eremotherium at sites such as those at Nova Friburgo in Brazil and Daytona Beach in Florida further prove that the two were synonymous and lacked any major differences between populations.

Fossils of Eremotherium from Mexico were first described in 1882 by French scientist Alfred Duges, though they consisted only of a fragmentary left femur, as a new species of the South American Scelidotherium, naming it S. guanajatense. The femur had been found in Pleistocene deposits in Guanajuato, Mexico, but the fossil has since been lost and the species is a synonym of E. laurillardi. Another species that might be considered valid was described in 1997 by Canadian zoologist Gerardo De Iuliis and French paleontologist Pierre-Antoine St-Andréc based on a single, approximately 39 cm long femur from the Pleistocene strata in Ulloma, Bolivia as Eremotherium sefvei, though it was first described in 1915 as a fossil of Megatherium. E. sefvei's geologic aging is less definite can only be placed in the general Pleistocene, but it is the smallest representative of Eremotherium and all post-Miocene megatheriids. In 2018, De Iuliis (one of the original describers of E. sefvei) noted that while its validity cannot be entirely precluded, the features of this species were not beyond the range of variation known among other megatheriines, with the type specimen bearing similarity to the specimen of Megatherium medinae.

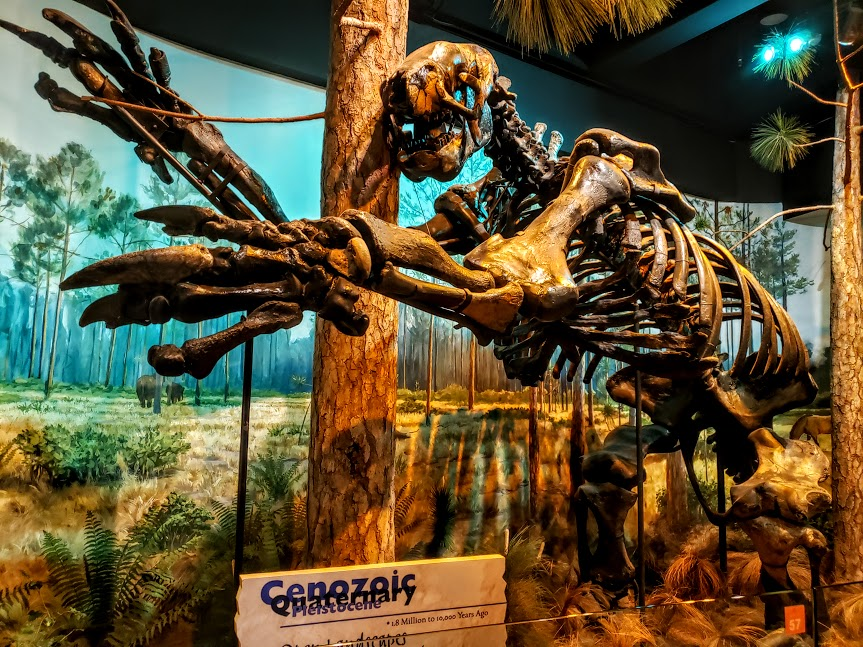
E. eomigrans at the NCMNS, depicted as inhabiting a longleaf pine savanna.

Two years later in 1999, De Iuliis and Brazilian paleontologist Carlos Cartelle erected another species of Eremotherium now seen as valid, E. eomigrans, based on a partial skeleton, the holotype, that had been unearthed from the latest Blancan (Latest Pliocene) layers of Newberry, Florida, USA, though many other fossils from the area were referred to it. Many of the fossils were isolated and had been recovered from sinkholes, river canals, shorelines, and hot springs, with few of the specimens being associated skeletons. So far, the latter has only been found in North America and reached a size similar to E. laurillardi, but comes from the Pliocene and Early Pleistocene and bears a pentadactyl, or five fingered, hand in contrast to the tridactyl hands of Megatherium and E. laurillardi.

The genus name Eremotherium was not erected until 1948 by Franz Spillmann, erecting a new species, E. carolinese, as the type species of the genus based on a 65 cm long skull with associated lower jaw, both fossils come from the Santa Elena Peninsula in Ecuador, and the species name was after the local village of Carolina. Although it was the type species of the genus for many years, the species has since been synonymized with E. laurillardi and has been replaced by it as the type species. The generic name Eremotherium is derived from the Greek words ἔρημος (Erēmos "Steppe", "desert") and θηρίον (Thērion "animal") after the landscape in Santa Elena Peninsula that E. carolinese was unearthed from. The following year, French taxonomist Robert Hoffstetter introduced the genus Schaubia for Samuel Schaub's Megatherium rusconii because he recognized its generic distinctness from Megatherium, though the genus name was preoccupied, so it was renamed Schaubtherium the following year. It was not until 1952 that he recognized similarities to Spillmann's Eremotherium and synonymized the two. Another dubious genus and species, Xenocnus cearensis, was dubbed in 1980 by Carlos de Paula Couto based on a partial unciform (wrist bone), though he mistook as the astragalus (tarsal bone) of a megalochynid, that had been found in Pleistocene deposits in Itapipoca, Brazil. Paula Couto even created a new subfamily, Xenocninae, for the genus, but reanalysis in 2008 proved that the fossil was instead from Eremotherium laurillardi.

== Classification ==
Eremotherium is a genus of the extinct ground sloth family Megatheriidae, which includes large to very large sloths in the group Folivora, which, together with the Megalonychidae and the Nothrotheriidae, form the superfamily Megatherioidea. The Megatherioidea also includes the three-toed sloths of the genus Bradypus, one of the two sloth genera still alive today. Eremotherium's closest relative in Megatheriidae is the namesake of the family Megatherium, which was endemic to South America, slightly larger, and preferred more open habitats than Eremotherium. Pyramiodontherium and Anisodontherium are also part of this subfamily, but are smaller and older, dating to the Late Miocene of Argentina. All of these genera belong to the subfamily Megatheriinae, which includes the largest and most derived sloths. The direct phylogenetic ancestor of Eremotherium is unknown, but may be linked to Proeremotherium from the Codore Formation in Venezuela, which dates to the Pliocene. The genus has numerous characteristics that are akin to those of Eremotherium, but are more primitive. Little is known about the evolution of the genus Eremotherium. It may have evolved in the Early Pliocene in South America, where only a few sites from this period are known, and dispersed by crossing the Isthmus of Panama, i.e. the formation of the land bridge connecting North and South America, in the course of the Great American Biotic Interchange. The oldest fossils come from the Pliocene of the southern United States in North America, suggesting that the species instead evolved there before colonizing South America. The discovery of Proeremotherium also supports this hypothesis, indicating that these or other close ancestors of Eremotherium first migrated to North America and evolved there, then moved back southward to South America after the formation of the Isthmus of Panama, similar to the glyptodont Glyptotherium.

The following phylogenetic analysis of Megatheriinae within Megatheriidae was conducted by Brandoni et al., 2018 that was modified from Varela et al. 2019 based on lower molariform and astragalus morphology:

- Megatheriinae
  - - Megathericulus
    - Diabolotherium
  - - Anisodontherium
    - - Pyramiodontherium
      - - Proeremotherium
        - - Megatherium
          - Eremotherium

== Description ==
=== Size ===
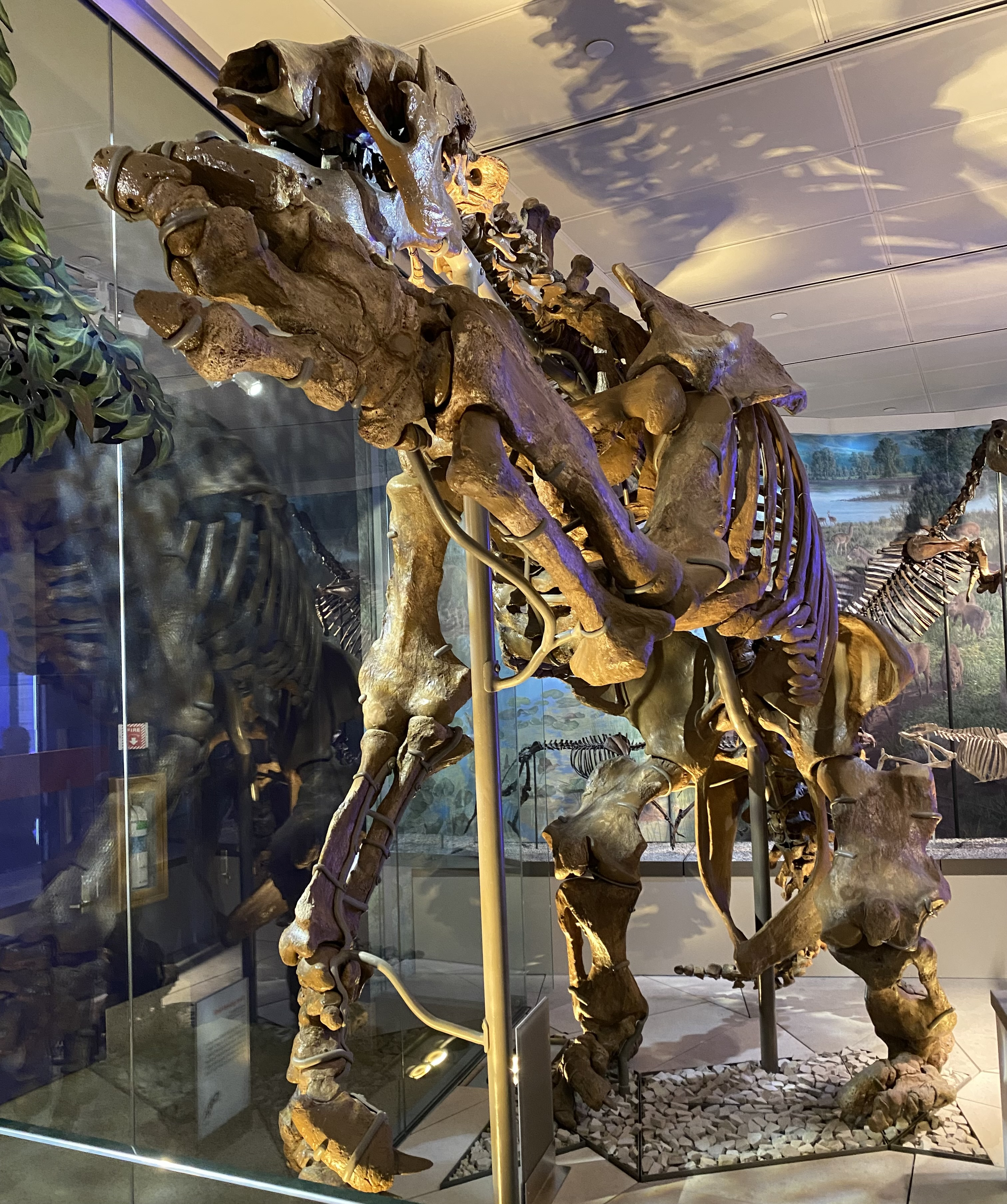
Eremotherium laurillardi skeleton at the Smithsonian National Museum of Natural History

Eremotherium was slightly larger than the closely related Megatherium in size, reaching an overall length of 6 metres (20 ft) and a height of 2 metres (6.6 ft) while on all fours, possibly up to 4 metres (13 ft) when it reared up on its hind legs. Weight estimates for Eremotherium have varied from 2,014 to 6,550 kilograms (4,440 to 14,440 lb). A 2023 study by H. Gregory McDonald suggested a body mass of around 3,961 kilograms (8,733 lb) Another 2023 study, done by Barbosa and colleagues, considered the body mass estimate of around 4,490 kilograms (9,900 lb) for fully grown adult Eremotherium to be the most accurate estimate. A 2024 study done by Dantas and colleagues, suggested than an average adult Eremotherium weighed 3,144 kilograms (6,931 lb), within the range of 968 to 5,969 kilograms (2,134 to 13,159 lb). In any case, it is one of the largest land-dwelling mammals of that time in the Americas, along with proboscideans like mammoths, mastodons and gomphotheres. As a ground-dwelling sloth, it had relatively shorter and stronger limbs compared to modern arboreal sloths and also had a longer tail.

=== Skull ===
The skull of Eremotherium was large and massive, but lighter in build compared to Megatherium. A complete skull measured 65 cm in length and was up to 33 cm wide at the zygomatic arches; at its highest, it reached 19 cm in height. The forehead line was clearly straight and not as wavy as in Megatherium. The nasal bone was shortened compared to the skull of Megatherium, giving it an overall truncated cone appearance. Further differences to Megatherium existed at the premaxillary bone: In Eremotherium this had an overall triangular shape and was only loosely connected to the upper jaw, whereas in Megatherium the premaxillary bone had a quadrangular shape, as well as a firm connection to the upper jaw. The occipital bone is semicircular in posterior view and sloped backwards in lateral view. The articular surfaces as the point of attachment of the cervical spine curved far outwards and were relatively larger than in tree sloths and numerous other ground sloths. The parietal bones had a far outward curved shape, which was partly caused by the large cranial cavity with a volume of 1600 cm^{3}. The strong zygomatic arch was closed, unlike today's sloths, but like the latter it had a massive bony outgrowth pointing downwards and backwards from the anterior base of the arch. In addition, a third outgrowth protruded diagonally upwards. The downward pointing bony process was clearly steeper than in other sloths. The eye socket was shallow and small and slightly lower than in Megatherium or modern sloths.

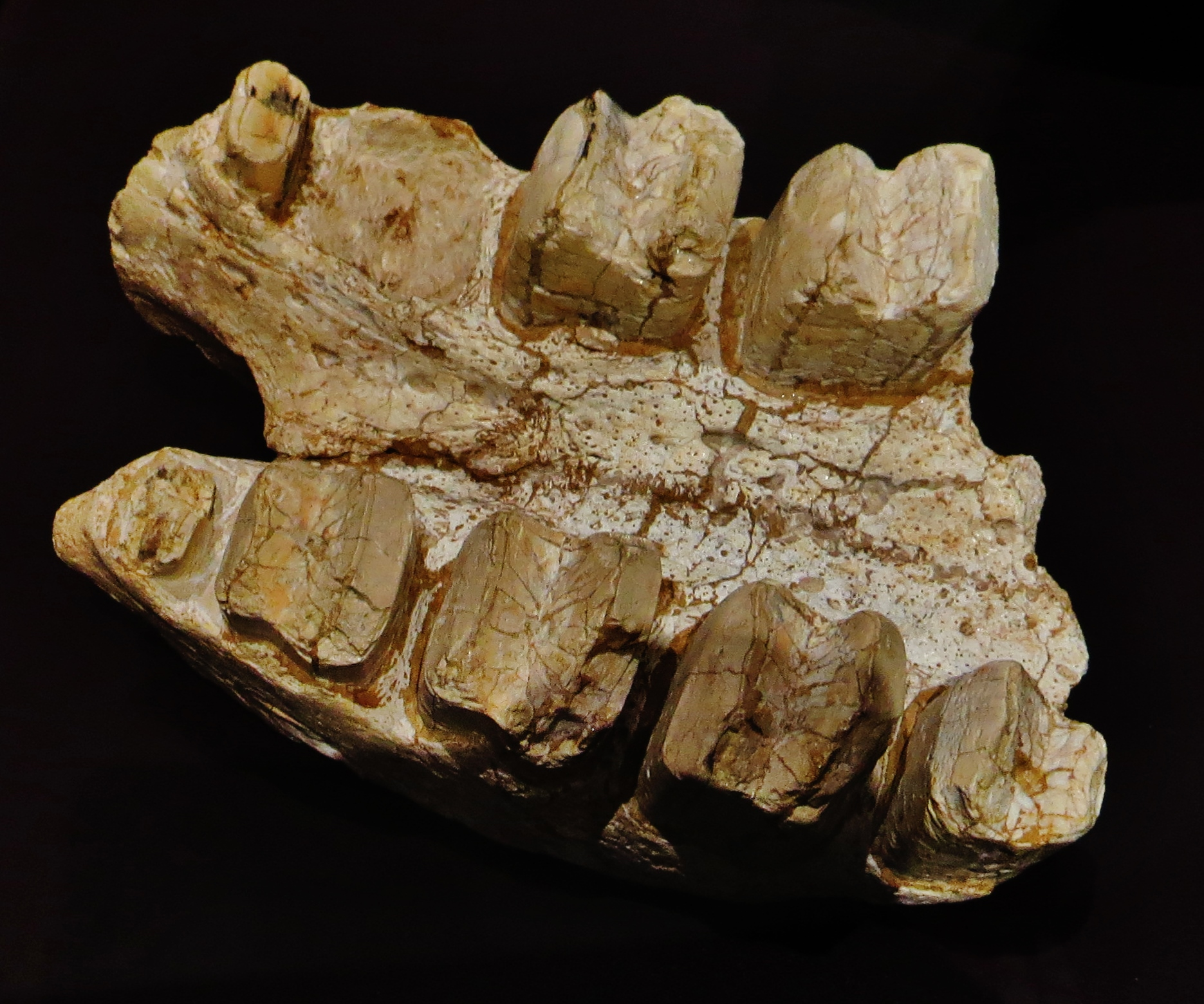
Partial maxilla of Eremotherium laurillardi

The lower jaw was about 55 centimetres (22 in) long, both halves were connected by a strong symphysis, which extended forward in a spatulate shape and ended in a rounded shape. Typical for all representatives of the Megatheriidae was the clearly downward curved course of the lower edge of the bone body, which resulted from the different length of the teeth. In Eremotherium this caused the lower jaw to be 14.5 centimetres (5.7 in) deep below the symphysis, 15 cm below the second tooth and 12.5 cm below the fourth. The thickness of the curvature of the lower margin of the mandible increased significantly in the course of individual development, but the ratio of the height of the mandibular body to the length of the tooth row remained largely the same. This differs markedly from Megatherium, in which the height of the mandible increased not only in absolute terms, but also relatively in relation to the length of the dentition. The mandibular body was also very thick, leaving little space for the tongue. The crown process rose up to 27 centimetres (11 in), and the articular process was only slightly lower. At the posterior, lower end there was a strong, clearly notched angular process, the upper edge of which was approximately at the level of the masticatory plane. At the anterior edge of the lower jaw there was a strong mental foramen. The dentition was typical for sloths, but in contrast to today's representatives it consisted of completely homodont teeth, which is a characteristic feature of megatherians. Each branch of the jaw had 5 teeth in the upper jaw and 4 in the lower jaw, so in total Eremotherium had 18 teeth. They resembled molars and, except for the front one, were quadrangular in shape, usually a good 5 centimetres (2.0 in) long in large individuals and very high-crowned (hypsodont) with a height of 15 centimetres (5.9 in). They had no roots and grew throughout their entire life. The enamel was also missing. However, two transverse, sharp-edged ridges were typically formed on the chewing surface to help grind food. The entire upper row of teeth grew up to 22 centimetres (8.7 in) long, while the lower reached up to 21 centimetres (8.3 in).

=== Postcrania ===
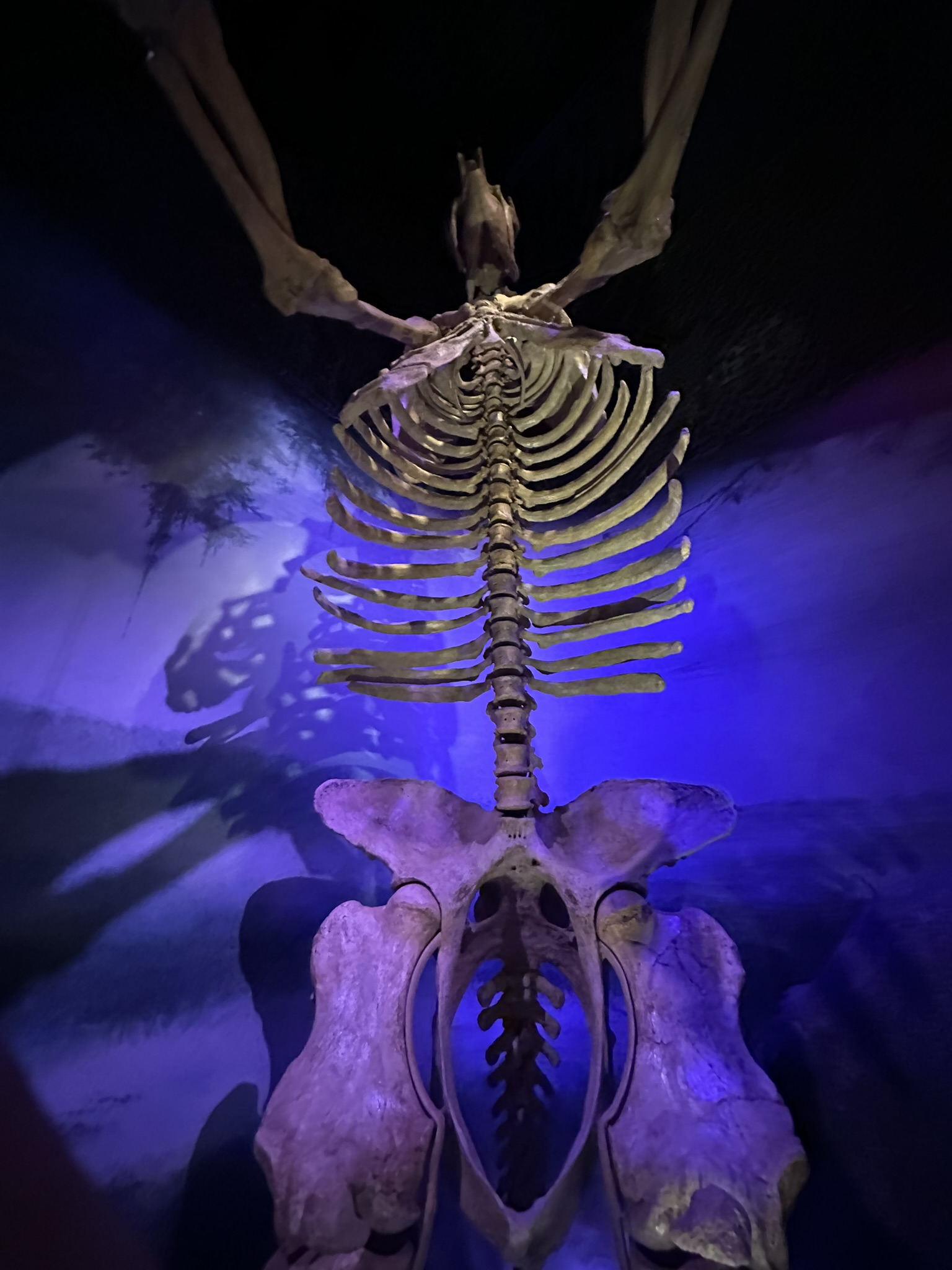
E. eomigrans mount at Florida Museum of Natural History

Almost all of the postcranial skeleton is known. The vertebrae were massively shaped, both at the vertebral bodies and at the lateral transverse processes. However, the vertebral bodies were compressed in length, so that the tail appeared rather short overall and generally did not exceed the length of the lower limb sections. It had 7 neck vertebrae. The humerus represented a long tube with a bulky lower joint end. The total length was about 79 centimetres (31 in). Distinctive, ridge-like muscle attachments on the middle shaft were typical. The forearm bones had much shorter lengths, with the spoke measuring about 67 cm, and the ulna 57 centimetres (22 in) in length. The femur was massive, had the broad build characteristic of megatherians and was narrowed in front and behind. It had an average length of 74 cm, the largest bone found so far was 89.5 centimetres (35.2 in) long and 45.1 centimetres (17.8 in) wide. The third trochanter, a prominent muscle attachment point on the shaft, typical of xenarthrans, was absent in Eremotherium as in all other megatherians. The shinbone and fibula were only fused together at the upper end and not also at the lower end as in Megatherium. In this case, the tibia became about 60 cm long. The forelegs ended in hands with three fingers (III to V). The two inner phalanges (I and II) were fused together with some elements of the carpus, such as the trapezium, to form a unit, the metacarpal-carpal complex (MCC). Thus, Eremotherium clearly deviates from Megatherium and other closely related forms, which possessed four-fingered hands. In Eremotherium, the metacarpal of the third digit was the shortest, measuring 19 cm in length, while those of the fourth and fifth were almost the same length, 28 centimetres (11 in) and 27.5 centimetres (10.8 in) respectively. The phalanx (the third phalanx) of the third and fourth fingers had a long and pointedly curved shape, which suggests correspondingly long claws. The fifth finger had only two phalanges and consequently no claw was formed there. (An exception is the older form E. eomigrans, whose hands, in contrast to other megateria, were still five-fingered, with claws on digits I to IV.) The foot, as in all megatheriids, was also three-fingered (digits III to V). It resembled the hand with an extremely short metatarsal of the third finger. That of the fourth finger reached 24 centimetres (9.4 in), that of the fifth 21 centimetres (8.3 in) in length. Deviating from the hand, only the middle digit (III) had three phalanges with a terminal phalanx bearing a long claw. The two outer digit had only two phalanges. This structure of the foot is typical for evolved megatherians.

== Fossil distribution ==
Fossils of Eremotherium have been found at over 130 sites. The earliest species, Eremotherium eomigrans is mainly known from Florida, with specimens also known from South Carolina as well as North Carolina, and dates from the late Pliocene to Middle Pleistocene. Eremotherium sefvei is only known from a single femur found in Bolivia of an uncertain age, while Eremotherium laurillardi is known from numerous fossils spanning from the late Pliocene to the end of the Pleistocene. There is confusion regarding what records should be assigned to E. eomigrans vs E. laurillardi due to the skull, jaw and tooth anatomy of the two species being indistinguishable. The range distribution of Eremotherium laurillardi is the widest of any ground sloth, spanning from 30.5° S to 40.3°N. The northernmost record of the species is in New Jersey, which likely represents a northward extension of its range during a warm interglacial period (probably the Last Interglacial/Sangamonian, around 130–115,000 years ago), while the southernmost record of the genus is in Rio Grande do Sul in southernmost Brazil. Most records of Eremotherium in Brazil are from the Brazilian Intertropical Region (BIR) in the east of the country, and are particularly frequently found in tank deposits (infillings of small depressions caused by erosion). Other records of the genus in North America north of Mexico are confined to the Gulf Coast and Southern Atlantic Coast, including Texas, Florida, South Carolina and Georgia. By the end of the Late Pleistocene Eremotherium was probably absent from North America north of Mexico, though it maintained a wide distribution from Mexico to Brazil at the time of its extinction. Most records of the genus in Mexico are from the southern and midlatitudes. Fossils of Eremotherium have been found at a wide range of altitudes, ranging from sea level to over 2,000 metres (6,600 ft).

== Palaeobiology ==
=== Locomotion ===
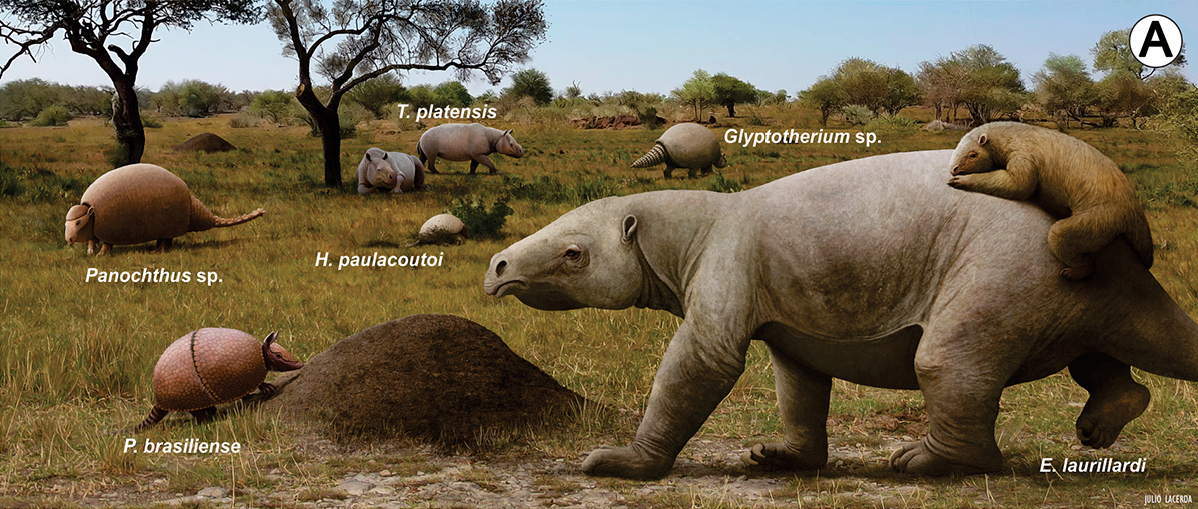
Life restoration of a hairless Eremotherium adult and juvenile (right) in a Pleistocene Brazilian landscape, also including the large ungulate Toxodon, and the glyptodonts Panochthus and Glyptotherium

The predominantly quadrupedal locomotion took place on inwardly turned feet, with the entire weight resting on the outer, fifth and possibly fourth phalanges (a pedolateral gait), whereby the talus was subject to massive reshaping. Likewise, the hands were turned inwards, in a position somewhat resembling the forefeet of the similarly clawed Chalicotheriidae, a now extinct group of odd-toed ungulates. It also suggests that locomotion was rather slow. It was also unable to perform digging activities, as has been demonstrated for other large ground sloths, which can also be seen in the construction of the forearm, just as the manipulation of objects was minimised due to the limited ability of the fingers to move in relation to each other. However, Eremotherium was able to stand up on its hind legs and pull branches and twigs with its hands, for example to reach the foliage of tall trees for feeding, as well as make defensive strikes with its long claws. The standing up was supported by the strong tail, similar to what is still the case today with armadillos and anteaters. The massive tail vertebrae in the front area of the tail suggest a strong musculature. Among other things, this concerns the coccygeus muscle, which attaches to the ischium and fixes the tail. Less well developed, on the other hand, were the epaxial muscles, which could cause the tail to straighten up.

=== Thermoregulation ===
While typically portrayed as furred animals, some scientists have suggested that large ground sloths were sparsely haired similarly to elephants. However, this was refuted by isotopic analysis, which argues that Eremotherium and other ground sloths had metabolic rates similar to extant xenarthrans mammals. The authors suggested that Eremotherium would've had body fur up to 1 centimetre (0.39 in) thick, although the fur density likely varied across its geographic range.

=== Social behaviour ===
Due to some group finds of several individuals at individual sites, such as in El Bajión in Chiapas in Mexico with four animals or in Tanque Loma on the Santa Elena in Ecuador with 22 individuals, some scientists discuss whether Eremotherium possibly lived and roamed in small, herd-like groups. Especially in Tanque Loma, the individuals recorded are composed of at least 15 adults and six juveniles. They were all found in close association in a single horizon, and they are interpreted as being contemporary with each other. The possible group was thought to have gathered at a waterhole and died there relatively abruptly due to an unknown event. This fossil bed may suggest that Eremotherium engaged in wallowing for thermoregulation purposes as seen with Hippopotamus.

On the other hand, sometimes clustered occurrences of Eremotherium such as the 19 individuals from the sinkhole of Jirau in Brazil are considered to be accumulations over a long period of time. In the case of the likewise giant ground sloth Lestodon from central South America, experts also interpret mass accumulations of remains of different individuals in part as evidence of phased group formation. Living tree sloths live solitary lives.

=== Diet ===
Eremotherium possessed extremely high-crowned teeth, which, however, did not reach the dimensions of those of Megatherium. As the teeth lack enamel, this hypsodonty may not be an expression of specialisation on grass as food, unlike mammals with enamel in their teeth. The different expression of hypsodonty in the two large ground sloths is probably rather to be sought in adaptation to divergent habitats—more tropical lowlands in Eremotherium and more temperate regions in Megatherium. From an anatomical point of view, the only moderately wide snout and the large total chewing surface of the teeth advocate a diet adapted to mixed plant foods. The average surface area of all teeth available for chewing food is 11,340 mm^{2}, which roughly corresponds to the values of the closely related Megatherium, but clearly exceeds those of the Lestodon, which is also giant but has a much broader snout. The latter genus belongs to the more distantly related Mylodontidae and was probably a specialised grazer. Moreover, the total purchase area is within the range of variation of present-day elephants, some of which also prefer mixed plant diets. Support for this view comes from various isotopic analysis on the teeth of Eremotherium. Thus, the animals probably fed on grass in rather open landscapes, but on foliage in largely closed forests. Paired stereomicrowear and δ^{13}C analysis suggests that an individual from the Late Pleistocene (34,705-33,947 cal yr BP), of Goiás, Brazil, was a mixed feeder, suggesting a high proportion of shrubs and trees; this is in contrast to the presumed diet from specimens from Northeast Brazil, which had a diet of C_{4} herbaceous plants. An E. laurillardi specimen from Belize indicates that during the region's brief wet seasons, the species fed on C_{4} grasses due to them being relatively palatable during such intervals of relative moisture, while a specimen from the Brazilian Intertropical Region reveals that its diet did not change over the course of a year. Where E. laurillardi coexisted with Megatherium americanum, as it did in a fossil assemblage found near Pessegueiro Creek in Rio Grande do Sul, δ^{13}C and δ^{18}O measurements show niche partitioning. The former consumed predominantly C_{3} plants and drank water depleted in ^{18}O while the latter ate a mix of both C_{3} and C_{4} plants and drank water enriched in ^{18}O.

=== Palaeopathologies ===
Numerous palaeopathologies have been described from E. laurillardi fossils in the BIR. These documented ailments include osteoarthritis and articular depressions, as well as spondyloarthropathy and calcium pyrophosphate deposition disease (CPPD). These diseases are evidenced by the presence of osteophytes, bone overgrowth, bone erosion, and rough subchondral bone in various specimens. Tendon avulsion, in addition to CPPD, is also reported from E. laurillardi remains from the Zabelê Paleontological Site. E. laurillardi is also the only xenarthran species from which linear defect is known.

== Relationship with humans and extinction ==
The disappearance of Eremotherium coincides with the end-Pleistocene extinction event, which post-dated arrival of humans in the Americas and saw the extinction of many megafauna (large animals) across the Americas, which included other ground sloths as well as animals like glyptodonts. One of the latest finds of Eremotherium is from Ittaituba on Rio Tapajós, a tributary of the Amazon, that has an uncalibrated C14 date to 11,340 BP (13,470 – 13,140 calibrated) and includes several skull and lower jaw fragments. In a similar period, finds of E. laurillardi at Barcelona in the Brazilian state of Rio Grande do Norte come from strata dating from 11,324 to 11,807 years ago. A 2025 study suggested that Eremotherium may have survived into the early to middle Holocene, based on radiocarbon dating of three specimens of E. laurillardi from the Jirau Paleontological Site, respectively dated to 6,208–7,714 calibrated (cal.) years Before Present (BP), 7,867–8,536 cal. years BP and 6,120–7,427 cal. years BP. There is no direct evidence of hunting by humans of Eremotherium. A possible indication of interaction is a tooth of Eremotherium that some authors have suggested had been modified by Paleoindians, which was unearthed from a doline on the site of the São-José farm in the Brazilian state of Sergipe. Some authors have regarded the idea as poorly evidenced, suggesting that the modification was more likely the result of natural processes, while other authors supported the human modification hypothesis for this specimen based on six different techniques including stereomicroscopy, scanning electron microscopy, energy dispersive spectroscopy, ultraviolet photoluminescence analyses, synchrotron-based X-ray fluorescence and micro-CT scans. Putative evidence of human modification were also reported in specimens of other Pleistocene xenarthrans including the ground sloth Glossotherium and the glyptodont Neosclerocalyptus.
