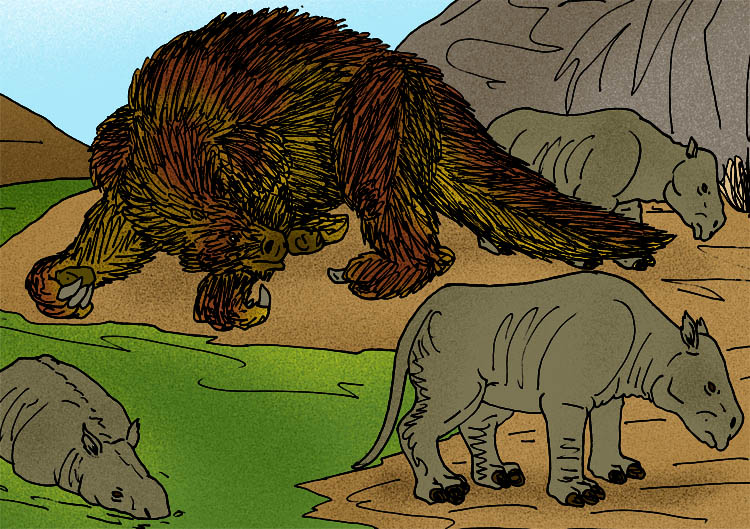
- Promegatherium nanum and Nesodon

Scientific classification
- Kingdom: Animalia
- Phylum: Chordata
- Class: Mammalia
- Infraclass: Placentalia
- Order: Pilosa
- Suborder: Folivora
- Superfamily: Megatherioidea
- Clade: †Megatheria
- Family: †Megatheriidae
- Subfamily: †Megatheriinae
- Genus: †Promegatherium; Ameghino, 1883

Type species
- †Promegatherium smaltatum Ameghino, 1883

Other Species
- †P. parvulum Ameghino, 1891 (nomen dubium); †P. remulsum Ameghino, 1886 (nomen dubium)

= Promegatherium =

Promegatherium Temporal range: Late Miocene (Huayquerian) ~9.0–6.8 Ma

Extinct genus of mammals from Argentina

Promegatherium ("before Megatherium") is a genus of prehistoric xenarthrans that lived in Argentina, during the Late Miocene. This genus is regarded as closely related to the later, and more famous genus, Megatherium, hence the reference in the name. The first specimens of Promegatherium were originally described by the biologist Florentino Ameghino in 1883.

Promegatherium was first described by Argentine paleontologist Florentino Ameghino in 1883 on the basis of an isolated molariform. In 1886, he named another species, P. remulsum, on the basis of molariform fragments.
