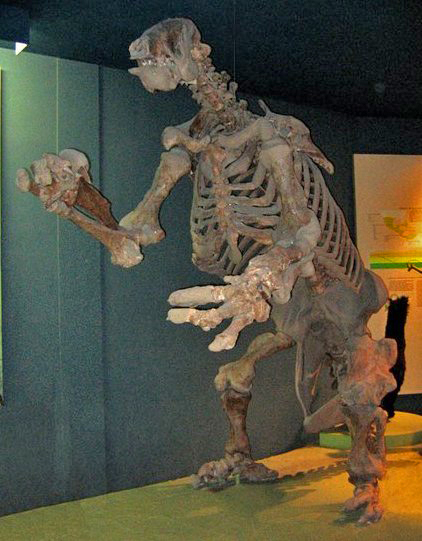
- Eremotherium skeleton, NMNH, Washington, DC.

Scientific classification
- Kingdom: Animalia
- Phylum: Chordata
- Class: Mammalia
- Infraclass: Placentalia
- Order: Pilosa
- Suborder: Folivora
- Superfamily: Megatherioidea
- Clade: †Megatheria
- Family: †Megatheriidae; J. E. Gray 1821

Type genus
- †Megatherium americanum

Subgroups
- †Thalassocnus?; †Planopsinae; †Planops; †Prepoplanops; †Prepotherium; †Proprepotherium; †Megatheriinae

= Megatheriidae =

Megatheriidae Temporal range: Late Oligocene (Deseadan)-Early Holocene (Lujanian) ~29–0.008 Ma

Extinct family of ground sloths

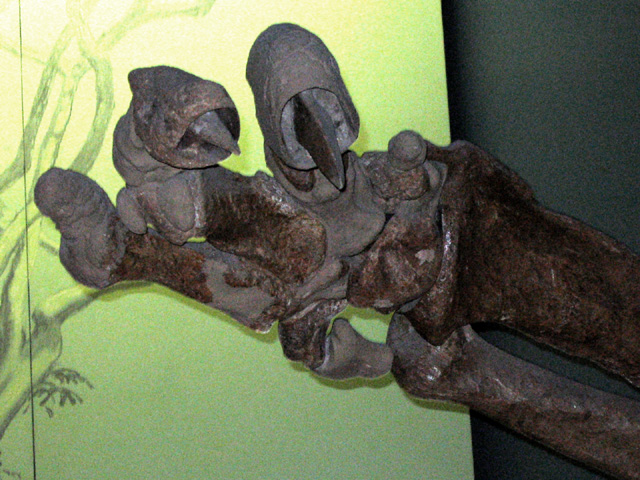
Closeup of hand, showing claws

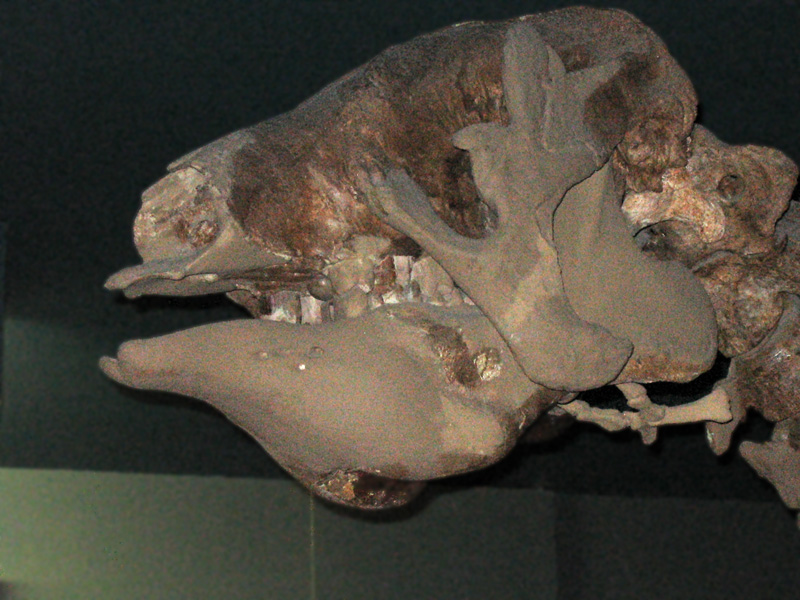
Closeup of skull

Megatheriidae is a family of extinct ground sloths that lived from approximately 23 mya—11,000 years ago.

Megatheriids appeared during the Late Oligocene (Deseadan in the SALMA classification), some 29 million years ago, in South America. The group includes the largest known ground sloths, the elephant sized Megatherium (given its name 'great beast' by Georges Cuvier) and Eremotherium. An early genus that was originally considered a megatheriid, the more slightly built Hapalops, reached a length of about 1.2 metres (3.9 ft). The nothrotheres have recently been placed in their own family, Nothrotheriidae.

The skeletal structure of these ground sloths indicates that the animals were massive. Their thick bones and even thicker joints (especially those on the hind legs) gave their appendages tremendous power that, combined with their size and fearsome claws, provided a formidable defense against predators.

The earliest megatheriid in North America was Sibotherium which arrived 5.3 million years ago, after crossing the recently formed Panamanian land bridge. At more than five tons in weight, 6 metres (20 ft) in length, and able to reach as high as 5.2 metres (17 ft), Eremotherium when fully erect was taller than an African bush elephant bull. Unlike relatives, this species retained a plesiomorphic extra claw. While other species of Eremotherium had four fingers with only two or three claws, E. eomigrans had five fingers, four of them with claws up to nearly 30 centimetres (1 ft) long.

== Phylogeny ==
The following sloth family phylogenetic tree is based on collagen and mitochondrial DNA sequence data (see Fig. 4 of Presslee et al., 2019).

- Folivora
  - † Megalocnidae (Caribbean sloths)
  - - - Mylodontoidea
        - † Scelidotheriidae
        - - † Mylodontidae
          - Choloepodidae (two-toed sloths)
      - Megatherioidea
        - - † Megalonychidae
            † Megalonyx jeffersoni
          - Bradypodidae (three-toed sloths)
            - Bradypus torquatus
            - - Bradypus pygmaeus
              - - Bradypus tridactylus
                - Bradypus variegatus
        - - † Nothrotheriidae
            † Nothrotheriops shastensis
          - † Megatheriidae
            † Megatherium americanum

The following phylogeny is based on Varela et al. 2019.

- Folivora
  - Pseudoglyptodon
  - - Bradypodidae
      Bradypus
    - Eufolivora
      - Mylodontidae
        - Nematherium
        - - Scelidotheriinae
            - Analcitherium
            - - Neonematherium
              - - Sibyllotherium
                - - Proscelidodon
                  - - Catonyx
                    - - Scelidotherium
                      - Valgipes
          - - Pseudoprepotherium
            - - Orophodontinae?
                - Brievabradys
                - - Octodontotherium
                  - - Paroctodontotherium
                    - - Octomylodon
                      - - Urumacotherium
                        - - Baraguatherium
                          - Octodontobradys
              - Mylodontinae
                - Mylodon
                - - - Thinobadistes
                    - - Lestodon
                      - - Lestobradys
                        - Bolivartherium
                  - - - Simomylodon
                      - Pleurolestodon
                    - - Glossotherium
                      - Paramylodon
      - Megatherioidea
        - - Schismotherium
          - Pelecyodon
        - - Megalonychidae
            - Hapalops
            - - Hyperleptus
              - - Eucholoeops
                - - Pseudortotherium
                  - - Megalonychotherium
                    - - Megalonychinae
                        - Pliometanastes
                        - - Megalonyx
                          - - Australonyx
                            - - Megistonyx
                              - Ahytherium
                      - - Pliomorphus
                        - - Megalocninae
                            - Megalocnus
                            - Parocnus
                          - Choloepodinae
                            - Acratocnus
                            - - Neocnus
                              - Choloepus
          - Megatheria
            - Analcimorphus
            - - Nothrotheriidae
                - Thalassocninae
                  Thalassocnus
                - Nothrotheriinae
                  - Lakukullus
                  - - - Mionothropus
                      - - Nothrotherium
                        - Nothrotheriops
                    - - Pronothrotherium
                      - - Aymaratherium
                        - Xyophorus
              - Megatheriidae
                - Planopsinae
                  - Prepoplanops
                  - - Planops
                    - Prepotherium
                - Megatheriinae
                  - - Diabolotherium
                    - Megathericulus
                  - - Anisodontherium
                    - - Pyramiodontherium
                      - - Proeremotherium
                        - - Eremotherium
                          - Megatherium
