= Prepotherium =

Prepotherium Temporal range: Early-Mid Miocene (Santacrucian-Mayoan) ~17.5–11.6 Ma

Scientific classification
- Domain: Eukaryota
- Kingdom: Animalia
- Phylum: Chordata
- Class: Mammalia
- Order: Pilosa
- Family: †Megatheriidae
- Subfamily: †Planopsinae
- Genus: †Prepotherium; Ameghino, 1891

Species
- P. filholi; P. moyani; P. potens Ameghino 1891

Extinct genus of ground sloths

Prepotherium is an extinct genus of megatheriid ground sloths that lived during the Miocene period. Fossils of Prepotherium have been found in the Collón Curá and Santa Cruz Formations of Argentina.

Prepotherium differed from Megatherium by being smaller and having a less exaggeratedly convex inferior border of the lower jaw.

== Redefined species ==
An additional species from Venezuela, P. venezuelanum, was named by R. Collins in 1935. from fossils found in the Portuguesa state and additional remains from the Acre state in Brazil. However, this species was later reclassified in its own genus, Pseudoprepotherium, as a basal member of another family of ground sloths, the Mylodontidae.
