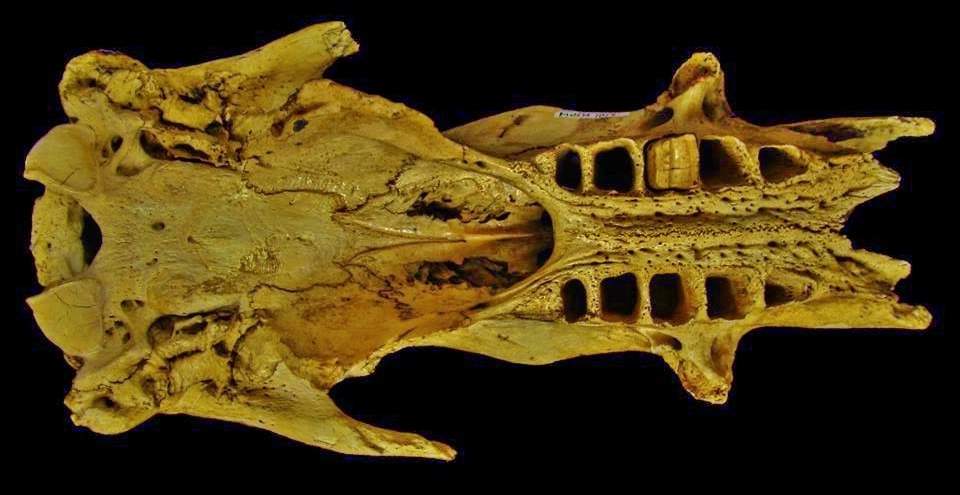
- Ventral view of the skull

Scientific classification
- Kingdom: Animalia
- Phylum: Chordata
- Class: Mammalia
- Order: Pilosa
- Family: †Megatheriidae
- Genus: †Diabolotherium; Pujos et al., 2007
- Species: †D. nordenskioldi

Binomial name
- †Diabolotherium nordenskioldi (Kraglievich, 1926)

= Diabolotherium =

Diabolotherium Temporal range: Late Pleistocene (Lujanian) ~0.02–0.011 Ma

Extinct genus of ground sloths

Diabolotherium is an extinct genus of megatheriine ground sloth, known from the Late Pleistocene of Peru. Unlike most other extinct mainland sloths, it seems to have been a climber, similar to extinct sloths from the Caribbean. The genus contains a single species, Diabolotherium nordenskioldi, originally described as a species of Nothropus in 1926. Fossils of this genus were found at the coastal Piedra Escrita site and the Andean Casa del Diablo cave.

== Description ==
Diabolotherium is a relatively small member of the Megatherioidea, though its specific phylogenetic position is unclear. It is known from a number of individual bones and a partial skeleton. A complete skull is known, but has not yet been described. Based on the fragmentary skull of an immature individual, the profile line of the parietal bones was slightly arched. Most likely a crest was formed in adult individuals. When viewed from behind, the occiput had a rectangular shape, being low and relatively wide. The joints for the cervical vertebrae pointed slightly downwards and were not very prominent, a feature that also occurs in several extinct representatives of the Megalonychidae of the Caribbean islands. The posterior section of the zygomatic arch started directly in front of the ear canal on the temporal bone. It was extremely short, positioned at an angle of 25° to the central axis of the skull and curved slightly downwards. The front part of the arch began on the upper jaw above the second and third tooth. The lower jaw is only known in fragments, the two most complete specimens so far differ in size by 10%. The anterior, spatulate extension of the symphysis, which is typical of numerous sloths, has only been preserved in its posterior part; the full length is unknown. At the base of the process, there was an outer mental foramen, an inner one being positioned 14 mm in front of the first tooth. The lower jaw reached its greatest height below the first tooth and measured 3.4 cm there. It became continuously lower towards the rear, making that for the Megatheriidae and Nothrotheriidae characteristic protuberance of the lower margin of the lower jaw was missing. The articular process protruded so that the mandibular joint was at least 4.5 cm above the posterior angular process (angular process).

The majority of the jaw finds so far are edentulous, but the structure of the dentition can be determined using the structure and arrangement of the alveoli. The dentition had the typical structure of the sloth with five teeth per half of the jaw in the upper and four in the lower jaw, so a total of 18 teeth were formed. All teeth were closed in a row and had a molar shape. This is reminiscent of the Megatheriidae but differs from the megalonychids, the frontmost tooth of which is reshaped like a canine, and due to a diastema is separated from the posterior teeth. The shape of the teeth also showed similarities to the large megatheria. They had a rectangular shape in the upper jaw and a more square shape in the lower jaw, but the foremost each had a slightly triangular outline. The chewing surface of a few teeth that were found showed two typical, transverse ridges. The length of the lower row of teeth was 4.4 cm.

The postcranial skeleton is not fully known. The atlas was narrowed in front and back, and the three articular surfaces that connected it to the following axis were in contact with each other. The total of ten tail vertebrae that have been handed down to date have elongated, but narrower transverse processes compared to the Megatheriidae. The limb bones became very long and slender compared to those of the other ground sloths and thus resembled today's tree sloths. The humerus reached up to 24 cm in length. The shaft was made of a bone ridge (crista deltoidea), which served as a muscle attachment point and was particularly strong in the middle part. As with all sloths, the lower end of the joint had a massive construction. The ulna was almost the same length as the humerus. The upper articular process, the olecranon, was relatively longer than that of today's tree and most of the extinct ground sloths. The spoke had a length of 18 cm, was short and massive and had a circular shaped head that started directly in front of the ulna. The hand comprised at least four digits (II to V), and it may be that the inner digit (I) was fused with some parts of the wrist to form a bone complex that is typical of some large ground sloths, the metacarpal-carpal complex (MCC). Of the four formed digits, however, only three (II to IV) were functional. It is noteworthy that these had metacarpal bones of almost the same size, whose length was 3.9 to 4.1 cm, which is unusual for extinct sloths. In the Megatheriidae and Nothrotheriidae, the length of the metacarpals increased significantly from the second to the fourth ray. The terminal phalanges had a triangular shape in longitudinal section, indicating that they had claws. The length of the last phalanx of the central ray was 6 cm, it was built narrow and slightly curved downwards, which suggests a correspondingly shaped claw. Compared to today's tree sloths, however, it seems to have been comparatively shorter. From the posterior musculoskeletal system, apart from the slender iliac bone, the talus and the heel bone as well as individual parts of the metatarsus, hardly any bone elements have survived.

== Etymology ==
The generic name combines the Latin word diabolo ('devil'), commemorating the type locality Casa del Diablo Cave, and the Ancient Greek word thēríon (θηρίον, 'beast'). The specific epithet nordenskioldi refers to Erland Nordenskioldi as the discoverer of the holotype, and was already in use by Lucas Kraglievich in 1926 when the specific epithet "Nothropus" nordenskioldi was assigned.

== Taxonomy ==
The taxon was originally described in 1926 by Kraglievich as a member of the genus Nothropus. When it was redescribed in 2007, it was found to be distinct enough to be placed in the separate genus Diabolotherium and was placed in the family Megalonychidae, though the type skull was missing its teeth. When teeth were found, it instead was found it within Megatheroidea, a larger grouping which contains Megalonychidae as well as Nothrotheriidae and Megatheriidae, but did not find close clustering with any of the aforementioned groups.

== Paleobiology ==
=== Palaeoecology ===
Based on its relative muzzle width, D. nordenskioldi was a mixed feeder that leaned more towards browsing than grazing. It had a low occlusal surface area relative to its body mass, suggesting a relatively low metabolism.

=== Locomotion ===
Diabolotherium is noteworthy for its the long and slender limb bones, which are rarely found in other extinct sloths and usually appear shorter and more robust. However, they are similar to those of today's tree sloths. The clearly spherical head of the humerus is characteristic of all sloths, which enables a very flexible arm movement in connection with the shoulder blade. Above all, the design of the upper articular process of the ulna, the olecranon, is decisive for the main activity of secondary articular animals and other mammals. The olecranon is extremely long in burrowing secondary articulated animals, such as armadillos or some large ground sloths. This enables the animals to muster the strength they need to dig, as the triceps that attach here increases the leverage due to the greater length of the appendage. Purely terrestrial forms have a much shorter extension, but the shortest occurs in today's sloths hanging with their backs down in the branches. Diabolotherium has a longer olecranon than the recent sloths, but it is significantly shorter than that of burrowing representatives. Its proportions correspond roughly to those of the extinct Hapalops, to which semi-scansorial locomotion is attributed, whereby the climbing method corresponded more to that of today's tamanduas. The fact that Diabolotherium was able to climb is supported by the upper joint capsule of the ulna, which circumscribes an open circle of about 105 ° and is therefore extraordinarily wide. Together with the lower joint of the humerus that engages here, it forms the elbow joint, The wide opening of the joint capsule of the ulna gave the forearm significantly more freedom of movement. In connection with the position of the spoke pushed in front of the ulna and its circular, upper head, it can be assumed that the forearm could be turned in and out very well and was overall very mobile. This resulted in a highly flexible upper-lower arm connection. Several bone ridges on the shaft of the spoke also show strongly developed forearm muscles, which in turn led to a more rotatable hand, which is also confirmed by the sometimes short design of some carpal bones. The three equally long rays of the hand in turn indicate an increased ability to grip, which was severely limited in the large ground sloths. Diabolotherium is one of the few extinct sloths known to have pursued this type of locomotion.

The climbing locomotion of Diabolotherium was originally associated with a solely arboreal way of life, analogous to today's sloths or some forms known from the Lower Miocene of the Santa Cruz Formation. For the Cupisnique desert, where the first partial skeleton comes from, the existence of oases for the Pleistocene could be proven, which could support the possibility of climbing in trees. But since a large part of the more recent finds were discovered in the high altitudes of the Andes, some of which were in caves and rock roofs that were difficult to access today, it is thus assumed that Diabolotherium was much more adapted to climbing in rocky and impassable terrain. The sometimes extensive joint surfaces, which enabled the high flexibility of the arm bones, also limited the stability of the joint connections. It is therefore likely that Diabolotherium tended to move slowly.
