= South American land mammal age =

Geologic timescale for prehistoric South American fauna

Locations of SALMA type localities
Pleistocene ages
Pliocene ages
Miocene ages
Oligocene ages
Eocene ages
Paleocene ages

The South American land mammal ages (SALMA) establish a geologic timescale for prehistoric South American fauna beginning 64.5 Ma during the Paleocene and continuing through to the Late Pleistocene (0.011 Ma). These periods are referred to as ages, stages, or intervals and were established using geographic place names where fossil materials where obtained.

The basic unit of measurement is the first/last boundary statement. This shows that the first appearance event of one taxon is known to predate the last appearance event of another. If two taxa are found in the same fossil quarry or at the same stratigraphic horizon, then their age-range zones overlap.

== Background ==
South America was an island continent for much of the Cenozoic, or the "Age of Mammals". As a result, its mammals evolved in their own unique directions, as Australia and Madagascar still have today.

=== Paleogeographic timeline ===
A simplified paleogeographic timeline of South America:

- 66 Ma – South America was connected to both North America and Antarctica. Soon after this point, it lost its connection to North America.
- 66–50 Ma – Tiupampan to Casamayoran - South America was connected to Antarctica which, in turn, was connected to Australia. The Antarctica–Australia connection was lost around the end of this interval or perhaps as much as 15 million years later.
- 50–34 Ma – Casamayoran to Tinguirirican - South America was connected to Antarctica, which was not yet covered by ice.
- 34 Ma – Tinguirirican - South America and Antarctica became detached and glaciations started to form in Antarctica.
- 34–9 Ma – Tinguirirican to Chasicoan - South America had no land connections to any other continent.
- 9–3 Ma – Huayquerian to Chapadmalalan - islands formed between South and North America. A complete Isthmus of Panama most likely formed near the end of this interval, leading to the Great American Biotic Interchange (GABI).
- 3 Ma to present – Uquian to Holocene - the land connection between South and North America is established and migration between the formerly separated continents occurs. Significantly higher rates of extinction due to climatic changes occur in South America compared to North America, resulting in an asymmetrical exchange of species between the continents. North American originating taxa diversify significantly in South America during this period. It was previously believed this asymmetry was due to the main migrational route being from north to south, rather than the opposite way.
- Pleistocene – the glacials and interglacials of the Pleistocene caused drastic eustatic sea level changes, widening and narrowing the land bridge at the 'bottleneck' of Panama. As a side-effect, the vegetation changed during this period of strong climatic changes.
- Late Pleistocene – the earliest humans arrived in South America and settled in various parts of the continent. Evidence for cohabitation with the latest Pleistocene megafauna has been found at multiple locations, such as Monte Verde in coastal Chile and Tibitó on the Altiplano Cundiboyacense in Colombia.

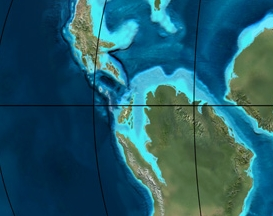
Since about 110 million years ago, South America and Africa are detached

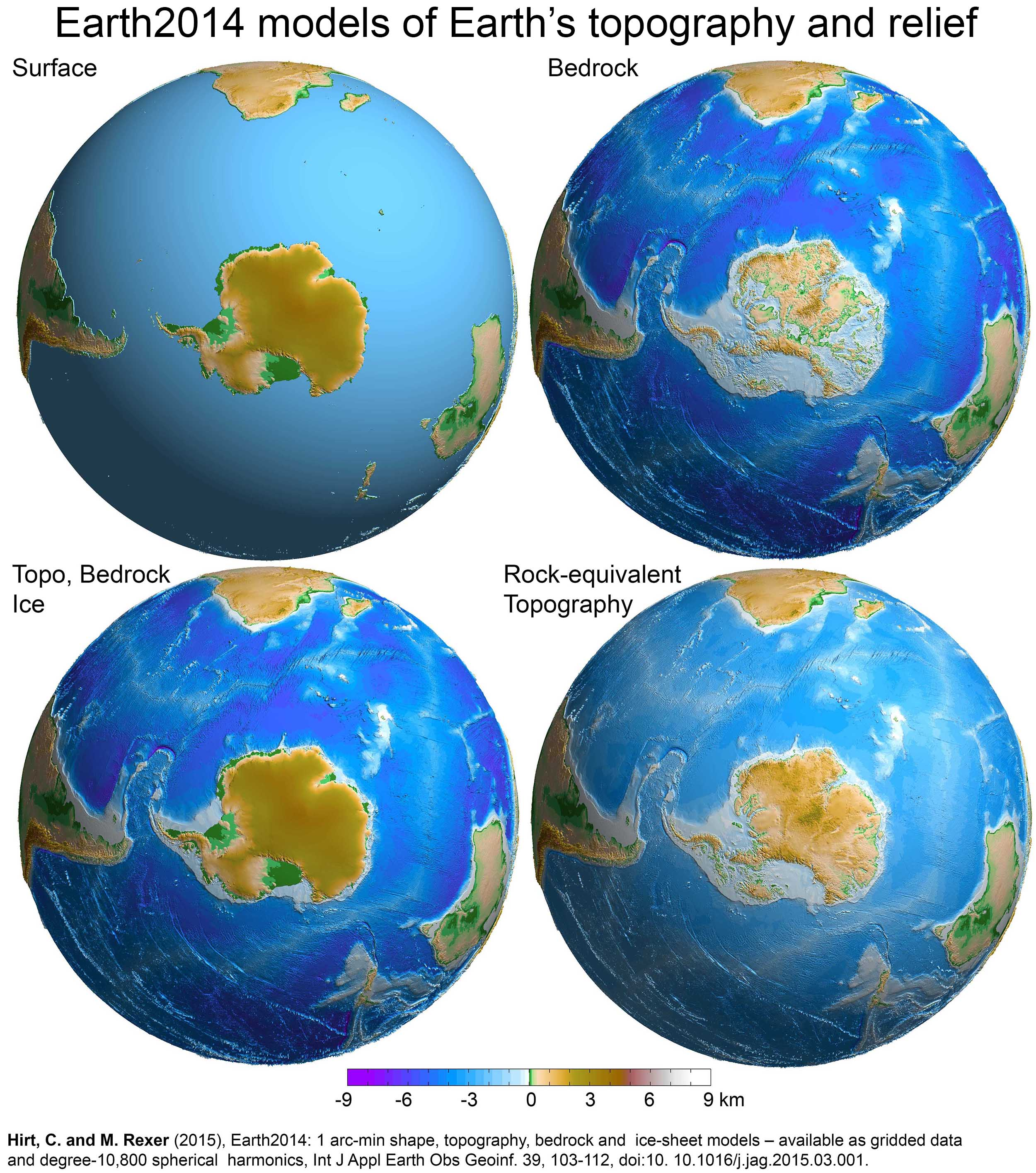
Antarctica, Australia and South America were attached as one large isolated paleocontinent for about 15 million years

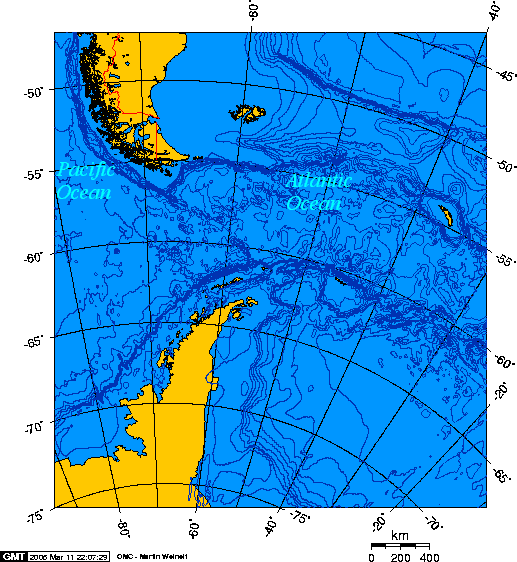
The Drake Passage, separating South America from Antarctica, was formed since the latest Eocene (~35 Ma)

The paleogeographical history of South America, with the separation from Africa and Antarctica

== Definitions ==
Including some revised age estimates for Paleogene units.

Epoch	SALMA	Top age (Ma)	Base age (Ma)	Etymology	Country	Location
Holocene		0	0.011			
Late Pleistocene	Lujanian	0.011	0.4	Luján Formation	Argentina	Buenos Aires Province
Mid Pleistocene	Ensenadan	0.4	1.95	La Ensenada Formation	Argentina	Buenos Aires Province
Early Pleistocene	Marplatan	1.95	3.3	Uquía Formation	Argentina	Jujuy Province
Late Pliocene	Chapadmalalan	3.3	5	Chapadmalal Formation	Argentina	Buenos Aires Province
Early Pliocene	Montehermosan	5.0	6.8	Monte Hermoso Formation	Argentina	Buenos Aires Province
Late Miocene	Montehermosan	5.0	6.8	Monte Hermoso Formation	Argentina	Buenos Aires Province
Late Miocene	Huayquerian	6.8	9.0	Huayquerías Formation	Argentina	Mendoza Province
Late Miocene	Chasicoan	9.0	10.0	Arroyo Chasicó Formation	Argentina	Buenos Aires Province
Late Miocene	Mayoan	10.0	11.8	Río Mayo Formation	Argentina	Chubut Province
Mid Miocene	Laventan	11.8	13.8	La Venta fauna	Colombia	Huila Department
Mid Miocene	Colloncuran	13.8	15.5	Collón Curá Formation	Argentina	Neuquén Province
Early Miocene	Friasian	15.5	16.3	Río Frías Formation	Chile	Aysén Region
Early Miocene	Santacrucian	16.3	17.5	Santa Cruz Formation	Argentina	Santa Cruz Province
Early Miocene	Colhuehuapian	17.5	21.0	Colhué Huapí Member	Argentina	Chubut Province
Early Miocene	Deseadan	21.0	29.0	Deseado Formation	Argentina	Santa Cruz Province
Late Oligocene	Deseadan	21.0	29.0	Deseado Formation	Argentina	Santa Cruz Province
Early Oligocene	Tinguirirican	29.0	36.0	Tinguiririca fauna	Chile	O'Higgins Region
Late Eocene	Tinguirirican	29.0	36.0	Tinguiririca fauna	Chile	O'Higgins Region
Late Eocene	Divisaderan	?	?	Divisadero Largo Formation	Argentina	Mendoza Province
Middle Eocene	Mustersan	36.0	38.0	Lake Musters	Argentina	Chubut Province
Middle Eocene	Casamayoran	38.0	48.0	Casamayor Formation	Argentina	Santa Cruz Province
Early Eocene	Riochican	~49.0	~49.0	Río Chico Group	Argentina	Chubut Province
Early Eocene	Itaboraian	50.0	53.0	Itaboraí Formation	Brazil	Rio de Janeiro State
Late Paleocene
Mid Paleocene
Early Paleocene	Peligran	63.2	63.8	Punta Peligro	Argentina	Chubut Province
Early Paleocene	Tiupampan	63.8	64.5	Tiupampa	Bolivia	Cochabamba Department

== Cenozoic fossiliferous stratigraphic units in South America ==
The following formations have provided vertebrate, insect or plant fossils, formations with other invertebrates are excluded:

SALMA	Formations	Country	Location	Notes
Lujanian	Luján Formation	Argentina	Salado Basin	
Lujanian	Chaco Formation	Argentina	Chaco Basin	
Lujanian	Chíu-Chíu Formation	Chile	Calama Basin	
Lujanian	Dolores Formation	Uruguay	Norte Basin	
Lujanian	El Palmar Formation	Argentina	Paraná Basin	
Lujanian	Fortin Tres Pozos Formation	Argentina	Chaco Basin	
Lujanian	Los Hoyos beds	Colombia	Upper Magdalena Valley	
Lujanian	La Huaca Formation	Peru	Sechura Basin	
Lujanian	La Invernada Formation	Argentina	Chaco Basin	
Lujanian	Ñuapua Formation	Bolivia	Chuquisaca Department	
Lujanian	Pampa La Brea Formation	Peru	Talara Basin	
Lujanian	Rotinet Formation	Colombia	Sinú-San Jacinto Basin	
Lujanian	Sabana Formation	Colombia	Altiplano Cundiboyacense	
Lujanian	Saladillo Formation	Argentina	Pampean Region	
Lujanian	Salto Ander Egg Formation	Argentina	Paraná Basin	
Lujanian	San Sebastián Formation	Peru	Eastern Peruvian Andes	
Lujanian	Santa Clara Formation	Argentina	Buenos Aires Province	
Lujanian	Santa Vitória Formation	Brazil	Pelotas Basin	
Lujanian	Soatá Formation	Colombia	Altiplano Cundiboyacense	
Lujanian	Sopas Formation	Uruguay	Norte Basin	
Lujanian	Tarija Formation	Bolivia	Tarija Basin	
Lujanian	Tezanos Pinto Formation	Argentina	Paraná Basin	
Lujanian	Touro Passo Formation	Brazil	Paraná Basin	
Lujanian	Ulloma Formation	Bolivia	Altiplano Basin	
Ensenadan	La Ensenada Formation	Argentina	Salado Basin	
Ensenadan	Belgrano Formation	Argentina	Buenos Aires Province	
Ensenadan	Chíu-Chíu Formation	Chile	Calama Basin	
Ensenadan	Graxaim Formation	Brazil	Pelotas Basin	
Ensenadan	Mesa Formation	Venezuela	Eastern Venezuela Basin	
Ensenadan	Miramar Formation	Argentina	Claromecó Basin	
Ensenadan	Sabana Formation	Colombia	Altiplano Cundiboyacense	
Ensenadan	Tarija Formation	Bolivia	Tarija Basin	
Ensenadan	Ulloma Formation	Bolivia	Altiplano Basin	
Ensenadan	Umala Formation	Bolivia	Altiplano Basin	
Ensenadan	Uquía Formation	Argentina	Eastern Argentinian Andes	
Ensenadan	Vorohué Formation	Argentina	Claromecó Basin	
Ensenadan	Yupoí Formation	Argentina	Paraná Basin	
Marplatan	Uquía Formation	Argentina	Eastern Argentinian Andes	
Marplatan	Bahía Inglesa Formation	Chile	Caldera Basin	
Marplatan	Charana Formation	Bolivia	Altiplano Basin	
Marplatan	Chíu-Chíu Formation	Chile	Calama Basin	
Marplatan	Hernandarías Formation	Argentina	Paraná Basin	
Marplatan	La Paz Formation	Bolivia	Altiplano Basin	
Marplatan	Sacaba Formation	Bolivia	Altiplano Basin	
Marplatan	San Andrés Formation	Argentina	Claromecó Basin	
Marplatan	San Gregorio Formation	Venezuela	Falcón Basin	
Marplatan	Umala Formation	Bolivia	Altiplano Basin	
Marplatan	Vorohué Formation	Argentina	Claromecó Basin	
Marplatan	Ware Formation	Colombia	Cocinetas Basin	
Chapadmalalan	Chapadmalal Formation	Argentina	Claromecó Basin	
Chapadmalalan	Puerto Alvear Formation	Argentina	Paraná Basin	
Chapadmalalan	Andalhuala Formation	Argentina	Santa María-Hualfín Basin	
Chapadmalalan	Bahía Inglesa Formation	Chile	Caldera Basin	
Chapadmalalan	Brochero Formation	Argentina	Sierras de Córdoba	
Chapadmalalan	Chíu-Chíu Formation	Chile	Calama Basin	
Chapadmalalan	Coquimbo Formation	Chile	Tongoy Bay	
Chapadmalalan	Horcón Formation	Chile	Valparaíso Basin	
Chapadmalalan	La Paz Formation	Bolivia	Altiplano Basin	
Chapadmalalan	La Portada Formation	Chile	Tiburón Basin	
Chapadmalalan	Pisco Formation	Peru	Pisco Basin	
Chapadmalalan	Río Quinto Formation	Argentina	Pampa de Las Salinas Basin	
Chapadmalalan	San Gregorio Formation	Venezuela	Falcón Basin	
Chapadmalalan	San José Formation	Argentina; Uruguay	Salado Basin; Santa Lucía Basin	
Chapadmalalan	Toro Negro Formation	Argentina	Sierra de Los Colorados	
Chapadmalalan	Umala Formation	Bolivia	Altiplano Basin	
Chapadmalalan	Ware Formation	Colombia	Cocinetas Basin	
Montehermosan	Monte Hermoso Formation	Argentina	Claromecó Basin	
Montehermosan	Aconquija Formation	Argentina	Sierra del Aconquija	
Montehermosan	Andalhuala Formation	Argentina	Santa María-Hualfín Basin	
Montehermosan	Bahía Inglesa Formation	Chile	Caldera Basin	
Montehermosan	Caleta Herradura Formation	Chile	Tiburón Basin	
Montehermosan	Casira Formation	Bolivia	Potosí mountain range	
Montehermosan	Codore Formation	Venezuela	Falcón Basin	
Montehermosan	Coquimbo Formation	Chile	Tongoy Bay	
Montehermosan	Corral Quemado Formation	Argentina	Santa María-Hualfín Basin	
Montehermosan	Ipururo Formation	Peru	Ucayali Basin	
Montehermosan	La Paz Formation	Bolivia	Altiplano Basin	
Montehermosan	Letrero Formation	Ecuador	Nabón Basin	
Montehermosan	Navidad Formation	Chile	Chilean Coast Range	
Montehermosan	Onzole Formation	Ecuador	Borbón Basin	
Montehermosan	Palo Pintado Formation	Argentina	Salta Basin	
Montehermosan	Paraguaná Formation	Venezuela	Falcón Basin	
Montehermosan	Pisco Formation	Peru	Pisco Basin	
Montehermosan	Puerta del Diablo Formation	Argentina	Valdés Basin	
Montehermosan	Raigón Formation	Uruguay	Norte Basin	
Montehermosan	Remedios Formation	Bolivia	Altiplano Basin	
Montehermosan	Río Negro Formation	Argentina	Colorado Basin	
Montehermosan	Río Quinto Formation	Argentina	Pampa de Las Salinas Basin	
Montehermosan	San José Formation	Argentina; Uruguay	Salado Basin; Santa Lucía Basin	
Montehermosan	Solimões Formation	Brazil	Solimões Basin	
Montehermosan	Umala Formation	Bolivia	Altiplano Basin	
Huayquerian	Huayquerías Formation	Argentina	Cuyo Basin	
Huayquerian	Andalhuala Formation	Argentina	Santa María-Hualfín Basin	
Huayquerian	Bahía Inglesa Formation - Cerro Ballena	Chile	Caldera Basin	
Huayquerian	Camacho Formation	Uruguay	Norte & Santa Lucía Basins	
Huayquerian	Cerro Azul Formation	Argentina	Colorado Basin	
Huayquerian	Chiquimil Formation	Argentina	Santa María-Hualfín Basin	
Huayquerian	Coquimbo Formation	Chile	Tongoy Bay	
Huayquerian	Las Flores Formation	Argentina	Sierra del Tontal	
Huayquerian	Entrerriana Formation	Argentina	Chaco Basin	(Note: Former name of Ituzaingó Formation)
Huayquerian	Epecuén Formation	Argentina	Claromecó Basin	(Note: Former name of Cerro Azul Formation)
Huayquerian	Içá Formation	Brazil	Madre de Deus Basin	
Huayquerian	Iñapari Formation	Peru	Madre de Dios Basin	
Huayquerian	India Muerta Formation	Argentina	Sierras Pampeanas	
Huayquerian	Ituzaingó Formation	Argentina	Paraná Basin	
Huayquerian	Kiyu Formation	Uruguay	Santa Lucía Basin	(Note: In later research considered part of the Camacho Formation)
Huayquerian	Madre de Dios Formation	Peru	Madre de Dios Basin	
Huayquerian	Maimará Formation	Argentina	Eastern Argentinian Andes	
Huayquerian	Mauri Formation	Bolivia	Altiplano Basin	
Huayquerian	Miramar Formation	Peru	Sechura Basin	
Huayquerian	El Morterito Formation	Argentina	Cajón Valley	
Huayquerian	Muyu Huasi Formation	Bolivia	Muyu Huasi Basin	
Huayquerian	Navidad Formation	Chile	Chilean Coast Range	
Huayquerian	Palo Pintado Formation	Argentina	Salta Basin	
Huayquerian	Paraná Formation	Argentina	Chaco Basin	
Huayquerian	Pebas Formation	Brazil; Colombia; Ecuador; Peru	Amazon Basin	
Huayquerian	Piquete Formation	Argentina	Salta Basin	
Huayquerian	Pisco Formation	Peru	Pisco Basin	
Huayquerian	Quehua Formation	Bolivia	Altiplano Basin	
Huayquerian	Raigón Formation	Uruguay	Norte Basin	
Huayquerian	Rosa Pata Formation	Bolivia	Altiplano Basin	
Huayquerian	Saldungaray Formation	Argentina	Buenos Aires Province	
Huayquerian	Salicas Formation	Argentina	Sierra de Velasco	
Huayquerian	Solimões Formation	Brazil	Solimões Basin	
Huayquerian	Urumaco Formation	Venezuela	Falcón Basin	
Chasicoan	Arroyo Chasicó Formation	Argentina	Colorado Basin	
Chasicoan	Bahía Inglesa Formation	Chile	Caldera Basin	
Chasicoan	Caujarao Formation	Venezuela	Falcón Basin	
Chasicoan	Cerro Azul Formation	Argentina	Colorado Basin	
Chasicoan	Coquimbo Formation	Chile	Tongoy Bay	
Chasicoan	Loma de Las Tapias Formation	Argentina	Tulum Valley	
Chasicoan	Madre de Dios Formation	Peru	Madre de Dios Basin	
Chasicoan	Mauri Formation	Bolivia	Altiplano Basin	
Chasicoan	Navidad Formation	Chile	Chilean Coast Range	
Chasicoan	Palo Pintado Formation	Argentina	Angastaco Basin	
Chasicoan	Paraná Formation	Argentina	Chaco Basin	
Chasicoan	Pebas Formation	Brazil; Colombia; Ecuador; Peru	Amazon Basin	
Chasicoan	Pisco Formation	Peru	Pisco Basin	
Chasicoan	Puerto Madryn Formation	Argentina	Valdés Basin	
Chasicoan	Urumaco Formation - Urumaco fauna	Venezuela	Falcón Basin	
Mayoan	Río Mayo Formation	Argentina	Golfo San Jorge Basin	
Mayoan	Coquimbo Formation	Chile	Tongoy Bay	
Mayoan	Gran Bajo del Gualicho Formation	Argentina	Colorado Basin	
Mayoan	Huaylas Formation	Chile	Parinacota Province	
Mayoan	Mauri Formation	Bolivia	Altiplano Basin	
Mayoan	Navidad Formation	Chile	Chilean Coast Range	
Mayoan	Paraná Formation	Argentina	Chaco Basin	
Mayoan	Pebas Formation	Brazil; Colombia; Ecuador; Peru	Amazon Basin	
Mayoan	Pisco Formation	Peru	Pisco Basin	
Mayoan	Puerto Madryn Formation	Argentina	Valdés Basin	
Mayoan	Urumaco Formation	Venezuela	Falcón Basin	
Mayoan	Yecua Formation	Bolivia	Paraná Basin	
Laventan	Honda Group - La Venta fauna	Colombia	Upper Magdalena Valley	
Laventan	Honda Group - Quebrada Honda fauna	Bolivia	Quebrada Honda Basin	
Laventan	Aisol Formation	Argentina	San Rafael Block	
Laventan	Bahía Inglesa Formation	Chile	Caldera Basin	
Laventan	Capadare Formation	Venezuela	Falcón Basin	
Laventan	Choquecota Formation	Bolivia	Altiplano Basin	
Laventan	Cura-Mallín Group	Chile	Cura-Mallín Basin	
Laventan	Gran Bajo del Gualicho Formation	Argentina	Colorado Basin	
Laventan	Ipururo Formation	Peru	Ucayali Basin	
Laventan	Mariño Formation	Argentina	Cuyo Basin	
Laventan	Mauri Formation	Bolivia	Altiplano Basin	
Laventan	Paraná Formation	Argentina	Chaco Basin	
Laventan	Pebas Formation	Brazil; Colombia; Ecuador; Peru	Amazon Basin	
Laventan	Pisco Formation	Peru	Pisco Basin	
Laventan	Santa Inés Formation	Venezuela	Eastern Venezuela Basin	
Laventan	Sincelejo Formation	Colombia	Sinú-San Jacinto Basin	
Laventan	Socorro Formation	Venezuela	Falcón Basin	
Laventan	Urumaco Formation	Venezuela	Falcón Basin	
Colloncuran	Collón Curá Formation	Argentina	Cañadón Asfalto Basin; Neuquén Basin	
Colloncuran	Castilletes Formation	Colombia	Cocinetas Basin	
Colloncuran	Cerdas beds	Bolivia	Altiplano Basin	
Colloncuran	Cura-Mallín Group	Chile	Cura-Mallín Basin	
Colloncuran	Gran Bajo del Gualicho Formation	Argentina	Colorado Basin	
Colloncuran	Mariño Formation	Argentina	Cuyo Basin	
Colloncuran	Mauri Formation	Bolivia	Altiplano Basin	
Colloncuran	Nazareno Formation	Bolivia	Tupiza Basin	
Colloncuran	Pebas Formation	Brazil; Colombia; Ecuador; Peru	Amazon Basin	
Colloncuran	Pisco Formation	Peru	Pisco Basin	
Friasian	Río Frías Formation	Chile	Aysén Basin	
Friasian	Castilletes Formation	Colombia	Cocinetas Basin	
Friasian	Chilcatay Formation	Peru	Pisco Basin	
Friasian	Cura-Mallín Group	Chile	Cura-Mallín Basin	
Friasian	Gran Bajo del Gualicho Formation	Argentina	Colorado Basin	
Friasian	Parángula Formation	Venezuela	Barinas-Apure Basin	
Friasian	Pebas Formation	Brazil; Colombia; Ecuador; Peru	Amazon Basin	
Friasian	Río Foyel Formation	Argentina	Patagonian Andes	
Friasian	Río Yuca Formation	Venezuela	Barinas-Apure Basin	
Santacrucian	Santa Cruz Formation	Argentina	Austral Basin	
Santacrucian	Aisol Formation	Argentina	San Rafael Block	
Santacrucian	Cantaure Formation	Venezuela	Falcón Basin	
Santacrucian	Castillo Formation	Venezuela	Falcón Basin	
Santacrucian	Cerro Boleadoras Formation	Argentina	Austral Basin	
Santacrucian	Chaguaramas Formation	Venezuela	Eastern Venezuela Basin	
Santacrucian	Chilcatay Formation	Peru	Pisco Basin	
Santacrucian	Chucal Formation - Chucal fauna	Chile	Altiplano Basin	
Santacrucian	Cura-Mallín Group	Chile	Cura-Mallín Basin	
Santacrucian	Gran Bajo del Gualicho Formation	Argentina	Colorado Basin	
Santacrucian	Jimol Formation	Colombia	Cocinetas Basin	
Santacrucian	Mariño Formation	Argentina	Cuyo Basin	
Santacrucian	Pinturas Formation	Argentina	Austral Basin	
Santacrucian	Río Yuca Formation	Venezuela	Barinas-Apure Basin	
Colhuehuapian	Colhué Huapí Member	Argentina	Golfo San Jorge Basin	
Colhuehuapian	Abanico Formation	Chile	Abanico Basin	
Colhuehuapian	Biblián Formation	Ecuador	Cuenca Basin	
Colhuehuapian	Castillo Formation	Venezuela	Falcón Basin	
Colhuehuapian	Cerro Bandera Formation	Argentina	Neuquén Basin	
Colhuehuapian	Chichinales Formation	Argentina	Neuquén Basin	
Colhuehuapian	Chilcatay Formation	Peru	Pisco Basin	
Colhuehuapian	Cura-Mallín Group	Chile	Cura-Mallín Basin	
Colhuehuapian	Gaiman Formation	Argentina	Valdés Basin	
Colhuehuapian	Gran Bajo del Gualicho Formation	Argentina	Colorado Basin	
Colhuehuapian	Monte León Formation	Argentina	Austral Basin	
Colhuehuapian	Montera Formation	Peru	Sechura Basin	
Colhuehuapian	Pirabas Formation	Brazil	Amazon Basin	
Colhuehuapian	Río Jeinemeni Formation	Argentina	Austral Basin	
Colhuehuapian	Sarmiento Formation	Argentina	Golfo San Jorge Basin	
Colhuehuapian	Uitpa Formation	Colombia	Cocinetas Basin	
Deseadan	Deseado Formation	Argentina	Deseado Massif	
Deseadan	Abanico Formation	Chile	Abanico Basin	
Deseadan	Agua de la Piedra Formation	Argentina	Precordillera	
Deseadan	Barzalosa Formation	Colombia	Upper Magdalena Valley	
Deseadan	Chambira Formation	Peru	Ucayali Basin	
Deseadan	Chilcatay Formation	Peru	Pisco Basin	
Deseadan	Dos Bocas Formation	Ecuador	Progreso Basin	
Deseadan	Fray Bentos Formation	Argentina; Uruguay	Paraná Basin	
Deseadan	Gaiman Formation	Argentina	Valdés Basin	
Deseadan	Mariño Formation	Argentina	Cuyo Basin	
Deseadan	Monte León Formation	Argentina	Austral Basin	
Deseadan	Moquegua Formation	Peru	Moquegua Basin	
Deseadan	Mugrosa Formation	Colombia	Middle Magdalena Valley	
Deseadan	Petaca Formation	Bolivia	Subandean Belt	
Deseadan	"Puca Group" - Lacayani fauna	Bolivia	Subandean Belt	
Deseadan	Río Baguales Formation	Chile	Aysén Basin	
Deseadan	Salla Formation	Bolivia	Salla-Luribay Basin	
Deseadan	Sarmiento Formation	Argentina	Golfo San Jorge Basin	
Deseadan	Tremembé Formation/São Paulo Formation	Brazil	Taubaté Basin	
Tinguirirican	Abanico Formation - Tinguiririca fauna	Chile	Abanico Basin	
Tinguirirican	Chota Formation	Peru	Bagua Basin	
Tinguirirican	Entre-Corrégos Formation	Brazil	Aiuruoca Basin	
Tinguirirican	Gualanday Group	Colombia	Central Colombian Ranges	
Tinguirirican	Laguna Brava Formation	Argentina	Precordillera	
Tinguirirican	Loreto Formation	Chile	Magallanes Basin	
Tinguirirican	El Milagro Formation	Peru	Bagua Basin	
Tinguirirican	Otuma Formation	Peru	Pisco Basin	
Tinguirirican	Sarmiento Formation	Argentina	Golfo San Jorge Basin	
Tinguirirican	Seca Formation	Ecuador	Progreso Basin	
Tinguirirican	Soncco Formation	Peru	Eastern Peruvian Andes	
Divisaderan	Divisadero Largo Formation	Argentina	Cuyo Basin	
Divisaderan	Abanico Formation	Chile	Abanico Basin	
Divisaderan	Andesitas Huancache Formation	Argentina	Golfo San Jorge Basin	
Divisaderan	Chota Formation	Peru	Bagua Basin	
Divisaderan	Leticia Formation	Argentina	Austral Basin	
Divisaderan	Loreto Formation	Chile	Magallanes Basin	
Divisaderan	Paracas Formation	Peru	Pisco Basin	
Divisaderan	Pozo Formation	Peru	Ucayali Basin	
Divisaderan	Sarmiento Formation	Argentina	Golfo San Jorge Basin	
Divisaderan	Soncco Formation	Peru	Eastern Peruvian Andes	
Divisaderan	Yumaque Formation	Peru	Pisco Basin	
Mustersan	Sarmiento Formation	Argentina	Golfo San Jorge Basin	
Mustersan	Abanico Formation	Chile	Abanico Basin	
Mustersan	Andesitas Huancache Formation	Argentina	Golfo San Jorge Basin	
Mustersan	Chota Formation	Peru	Bagua Basin	
Mustersan	Geste Formation	Argentina	Puna Plateau	
Mustersan	Laguna del Hunco Formation	Argentina	Cañadón Asfalto Basin	
Mustersan	Paracas Formation	Peru	Pisco Basin	
Mustersan	Pozo Formation	Peru	Ucayali Basin	
Mustersan	Soncco Formation	Peru	Eastern Peruvian Andes	
Mustersan	Vaca Mahuida Formation	Argentina	Neuquén Basin	
Mustersan	Ventana Formation	Argentina	Neuquén Basin	
Mustersan	Yahuarango Formation - Santa Rosa fauna	Peru	Ucayali Basin	
Casamayoran	Casamayor Formation	Argentina	Golfo San Jorge Basin	
Casamayoran	Abanico Formation	Chile	Abanico Basin	
Casamayoran	Bogotá Formation	Colombia	Altiplano Cundiboyacense	
Casamayoran	Cayara Formation	Bolivia	Cochabamba Department	
Casamayoran	Chota Formation	Peru	Bagua Basin	
Casamayoran	Fonseca Formation	Brazil	Fonseca Basin	
Casamayoran	Guabirotuba Formation	Brazil	Curitiba Basin	
Casamayoran	Huitrera Formation	Argentina	Neuquén Basin	
Casamayoran	Laguna del Hunco Formation	Argentina	Cañadón Asfalto Basin	
Casamayoran	Los Cuervos Formation	Colombia	Cesar-Ranchería Basin	
Casamayoran	Lumbrera Formation	Argentina	Salta Basin	
Casamayoran	Maíz Gordo Formation	Argentina	Salta Basin	
Casamayoran	Quebrada de los Colorados Formation	Argentina	Salta Basin	
Casamayoran	Sarmiento Formation	Argentina	Golfo San Jorge Basin	
Riochican	Río Chico Group	Argentina	Golfo San Jorge Basin	
Riochican	Bogotá Formation	Colombia	Altiplano Cundiboyacense	
Riochican	Bororó Formation	Argentina	Golfo San Jorge Basin	
Riochican	Chota Formation	Peru	Bagua Basin	
Riochican	Koluel Kaike Formation	Argentina	Golfo San Jorge Basin	
Riochican	Maíz Gordo Formation	Argentina	Salta Basin	
Riochican	Mogollón Formation	Peru	Talara & Tumbes Basins	
Riochican	Muñani Formation	Peru	Altiplano Basin	
Riochican	Peñas Coloradas Formation	Argentina	Golfo San Jorge Basin	
Riochican	Río Loro Formation	Argentina	Sierras Pampeanas	
Riochican	Salamanca Formation	Argentina	Golfo San Jorge Basin	
Itaboraian	Itaboraí Formation	Brazil	Itaboraí Basin	
Itaboraian	Bogotá Formation	Colombia	Altiplano Cundiboyacense	
Itaboraian	Cerrejón Formation	Colombia	Cesar-Ranchería Basin	
Itaboraian	Chota Formation	Peru	Bagua Basin	
Itaboraian	Koluel Kaike Formation	Argentina	Golfo San Jorge Basin	
Itaboraian	Las Flores Formation	Argentina	Golfo San Jorge Basin	
Itaboraian	Maíz Gordo Formation	Argentina	Salta Basin	
Itaboraian	Mealla Formation	Argentina	Salta Basin	
Itaboraian	Mogollón Formation	Peru	Talara & Tumbes Basins	
Itaboraian	Muñani Formation	Peru	Altiplano Basin	
Itaboraian	Peñas Coloradas Formation	Argentina	Golfo San Jorge Basin	
Itaboraian	Río Loro Formation	Argentina	Sierras Pampeanas	
Peligran	Peñas Coloradas Formation	Argentina	Golfo San Jorge Basin	
Peligran	Bogotá Formation	Colombia	Altiplano Cundiboyacense	
Peligran	Cerrejón Formation	Colombia	Cesar-Ranchería Basin	
Peligran	Chota Formation	Peru	Bagua Basin	
Peligran	Guaduas Formation	Colombia	Altiplano Cundiboyacense	
Peligran	Salamanca Formation	Argentina	Golfo San Jorge Basin	
Peligran	Santa Lucía Formation	Bolivia	Potosí Basin	
Tiupampan	Santa Lucía Formation	Bolivia	Potosí Basin	
Tiupampan	Chota Formation	Peru	Bagua Basin	
Tiupampan	Guaduas Formation	Colombia	Altiplano Cundiboyacense	
Tiupampan	Lefipán Formation	Argentina	Cañadón Asfalto Basin	
Tiupampan	Maria Farinha Formation	Brazil	Paraíba Basin	
Tiupampan	Salamanca Formation	Argentina	Golfo San Jorge Basin	

== Fossil content ==
SALMA	Group	Fossils	Formation	Notes
Lujanian	Mammals	Calomys callosus, Chaetophractus villosus, Ctenomys lujanensis, C. magellanicus, Dilobodon lujanensis, Doedicurus clavicaudatus, Dolichotis patagonum, Dusicyon avus, Eligmodontia typus, Equus (Amerhippus) cf. curvidens, Equus caballus, Eulamaops paralellus, Eutatus seguini, Galea musteloides, Glossotherium myloides, G. robustum, Glyptodon clavipes, G. perforatus, G. reticulatus, G. rudimentarius, Hemiauchenia paradoxa, Hippidion devillei, H. principale, Holochilus brasiliensis, Lagostomus maximus, Lama glama, L. gracilis, L. guanicoe, Lestodelphys halli, Lestodon armatus, L. gaudryi, L. trigonidens, Lontra longicaudis, Lycalopex gymnocercus, Lyncodon patagonicus, Macrauchenia patachonica, Megatherium americanum, Microcavia australis, M. robusta, Morenelaphus azpeitianus, M. lujanensis, Myocastor coypus, M. priscus, Neochoerus aesopi, Neochoerus sulcidens, Neuryurus rudis, Notiomastodon platensis, Pampatherium typum, Panochthus tuberculatus, Panthera onca, Panthera platensis, Pediolagus salinicola, Pseudalopex gymnocercus, Reithrodon auritus, R. cf. physodes, Scelidotherium leptocephalum, Smilodon populator, Stegomastodon superbus, Tayassu tajacu, Tolypeutes tricinctus matacus, Toxodon bilobidens, T. platensis, Arctotherium sp., Neosclerocalyptus sp.	Luján	
Lujanian	Mammals	Holmesina rondoniensis	Rio Madeira	
Lujanian	Birds	Cathartes fossilis, Lagopterus minutus, Nannopterum brasilianum, Sarcorhamphus fossilis	Luján	
Lujanian	Insects	Cyclocephala signaticollis, Diloboderus abderus, Epipedonota cristallisata, Nyctelia picipes, Scotobius pilularius	Luján	
Ensenadan	Mammals	Epieurycerus truncus, Tonnicinctus mirus	Ensenada	
Ensenadan	Mammals	Balaenoptera musculus, Eubalaena australis, Megaptera novaeangliae, Ziphiidae indet.	Graxaim	
Ensenadan	Mammals	Homotherium venezuelensis, Smilodon gracilis, Tapirus sp.	Mesa	
Ensenadan	Mammals	Eutatus sp., Mesotherium sp., Neosclerocalyptus sp., Palaeolama sp.	Miramar	
Ensenadan	Mammals	Equus (Amerhippus) andium, Equus (Amerhippus) insulatus, Andinomys cf. edea, Arctotherium tarijense, A. wingei, Calomys cf. lancha, Canis dirus, Canis proplatensis, Chaetophractus tarijensis, C. villosus, Charitoceros tarijensis, Chlamydotherium cf. sellowi, Chrysocyon brachyurus, Coendou magnus, Conepatus suffocans, Ctenomys brachyrhinus, C. subassentiens, Cuvieronius hyodon, C. tropicus, Dasypus cf. villosus, Dicotyles cf. major, Euphractus sexcinctus, Euryzygomatomys hoffstetteri, Felis platensis, Felis yaguaroundi, Glossotherium robustum, G. tarijensis, Glyptodon clavipes, G. reticulatus, Hemiauchenia cf. paradoxa, Hippidion bonaerensis, H. devillei, H. principale, Hoplophorus echazui, Hydrochoerus hydrochaeris, Kunsia fronto, Lama castelnaudi, L. glama, L. intermedia, L. mesolithica, L. cf. oweni, L. provicugna, Lestodon armatus, Lutreolina crassicaudata, Macrauchenia patagonica, Megatherium americanum, M. tarijensis, Myocastor coypus, M. perditus, Nectomys cf. squamipes, Neochoerus tarijensis, Neothoracophorus cf. elevatus, Nothropus tarijensis, Oxymycterus cf. paranensis, Palaeolama crequii, P. weddeli, Pampatherium cf. humboldtii, Panochthus cf. tuberculatus, Panthera onca, Phyllotis cf. darwini, Platygonus tarijensis, Propraopus sulcatus, Protocyon tarijensis, Pseudalopex gymnocercus, Puma concolor, Reigomys primigenus, Scelidodon tarijensis, Scelidotherium patrium, Smilodon populator, Tapirus tarijensis, Tapirus terrestris terrestris, Theriodictis tarijensis, Toxodon cf. platensis, Haplomastodon sp., Hippocamelus sp., Hydrochoerus sp., Nasua sp., Notiomastodon sp.	Tarija	
Ensenadan	Mammals	Hippidion devillei, Pardinamys humahuaquensis, Pseudomacrauchenia yepesi, Glyptodon sp., ?Neuryurus sp., cf. Palaeolama sp., Scelidotherium sp., Cervidae indet.	Uquía	
Ensenadan	Mammals	Glyptodon munizi	Vorohué	
Ensenadan	Mammals	Hippidion principale, Holmesina paulacoutoi, Lestodon armatus, Macrauchenia patagonica, Megatherium americanum, Neolicaphrium recens, Notiomastodon platensis, Pampatherium typum, Panthera onca, Smilodon populator, Tayassu pecari, Toxodon platensis, Arctotherium sp., Arctotherium wingei, Arctotherium tarijense, Dolichotis sp., Euphractus sp., Galea sp., Glyptodon sp., Lama sp., Mazama sp., Myocastor sp., Neosclerocalyptus sp., Panochthus sp., Propraopus sp., Scelidodon sp., Stegomastodon sp., Theriodictis sp., Tolypeutes sp.	Yupoí	
Ensenadan	Birds	Neochen debilis	Belgrano	
Ensenadan	Birds	Anas bahamensis, Anas cheuen, Callonetta talarae, Pleistoanser bravardi, Zonotrichia robusta	Miramar	
Ensenadan	Birds	Vultur gryphus	Tarija	
Ensenadan	Reptiles & amphibians	Leiosaurus marellii	La Ensenada	
Ensenadan	Reptiles & amphibians	Caiman venezuelensis, Crocodylia indet.	Mesa	
Ensenadan	Reptiles & amphibians	Bufo cf. marinus, Ceratophrys sp.	Tarija	
Ensenadan	Fishes	Pogonias cromis	Graxaim	
Uquian	Mammals	Chaetophractus cf. villosus, Ctenomys chapadmalensis, Hippidion devillei, Hydrochoeropsis dasseni, Lestodon ?castellanosi, Megatherium ?uquiensis, Paraglyptodon uquiensis, Platygonus uquiensis, Pyramiodontherium ?carlesi, Windhausenia delacroixi, Xiphuroides uquiensis, Erethizon sp., ?Panochthus sp., Urotherium sp., Doedicurinae indet., Euphractinae indet., Gomphotheriidae indet., Sclerocalyptinae indet.	Uquía	
Uquian	Mammals	Macrauchenia cf. ullomensis, Glossotherium sp., Plaxhaplous sp., Cervidae indet.	Charana	
Uquian	Mammals	Megatherium medinae	Chíu-Chíu	
Uquian	Mammals	Aenigmys diamantensis, Eumysops sp.	Hernandarías	
Uquian	Mammals	Thalassocnus yaucensis	Pisco	
Uquian	Mammals	Panochthus intermedius	Sacaba	
Uquian	Mammals	Eumysops marplatensis, Neuryurus sp.	San Andrés	
Uquian	Mammals	Palaeolama weddelli, Doedicurus sp.	San José	
Uquian	Mammals	Macrauchenia patagonica, Scelidodon cf. tarijensis, Cervidae indet.	Umala	
Uquian	Mammals	Eumysops cavoides, E. marplatensis, Galictis sorgentini, Leopardus vorohuensis, Platygonus chapalmalensis, Protocyon scagliaruen, Smilodon riggii, Canis sp., Catagonus sp., Didelphis sp., Dolichotis sp., Dusicyon sp., Hippidion sp., Lagostomus sp., Lama sp., Megatherium sp., Mesotherium sp., Microcavia sp., Microtragulus sp., Paedotherium sp., Palaeolama sp., Pithanotomys sp., Tremacyllus sp., Toxodon sp., Windhausenia sp.	Vorohué	
Uquian	Birds	Phalacrocorax aff. bougainvillii	Pisco	
Uquian	Birds	Aratinga vorohuensis	Vorohué	
Uquian	Reptiles	Uquiasaurus heptanodonta	Uquía	
Chapadmalalan	Mammals	Didelphis brachyodonta, Didelphis reigi, Lutreolina cf. crassicaudata, Paraglyptodon chapalmalensis, Platygonus marplatensis, Thylophorops chapalmalensis, Marmosa indet.	Chapadmalal	
Chapadmalalan	Mammals	Paedotherium typicum, Paramyocastor diligens, Eumysops sp.	Puerto Alvear	
Chapadmalalan	Mammals	Abrothrix magnus, Chukimys favaloroi	Brochero	
Chapadmalalan	Mammals	Caviodon multiplicatus, Doellotatus chapadmalensis, Dolicavia minuscula, Eucelophorus cf. chapalmalensis, Macrochorobates chapadmalensis, Macroeuphractus retusus, Paedotherium bonaerense, P. typicum, Pascualia aff. laeviplicata, Tremacyllus impressus, Actenomys sp., Lagostomus (Lagostomopsis) sp., Pithanotomys sp.	Río; Quinto	
Chapadmalalan	Mammals	aff. Holmesina floridianus, Marisela gregoriana, Pliodasypus vergelianus, Boreostemma sp., Cardiatherium sp., cf. Caviodon sp., Cyonasua sp., Neoepiblema sp., Megatheriidae indet., Toxodontidae indet.	San; Gregorio	
Chapadmalalan	Mammals	Artigasia magna, Plesiomegatherium hansmeyeri, Pliomegatherium sp.	San José	
Chapadmalalan	Mammals	Chorobates villosissimus, cf. Doellotatus inornatus, Lomaphorops corallinus, Neuryurus cf. giganteus, Pyramiodontherium scillatoyanei, Xyophorus aff. bandesioi, Eoauchenia sp., Paleuphractus sp., cf. Plesiomegatherium sp., Propediolagus sp., cf. Proscelidodon sp., Protabrocoma sp., cf. Urotherium sp.	Toro; Negro	
Chapadmalalan	Mammals	Ctenomys chapadmalensis, Doellotatus chapadmalensis, Paraglyptodon uquiensis, Microcavia sp., Plaina sp., Scelidotheridium sp.	Uquía	
Chapadmalalan	Mammals	Hydrochoeropsis wayuu, Pliomegatherium lelongi, Chapalmalania sp., ?Hyperleptus sp., Nothrotherium sp., Camelidae indet., Caviidae indet., Erethizontidae indet., Glyptodontidae indet., Lestodontini indet., Megalonychidae indet., Mylodontidae indet., Pampatheriidae indet., Proterotheriidae indet., Scelidotheriinae indet., Tardigrada indet., Toxodontidae indet.	Ware	
Chapadmalalan	Birds	Llallawavis scagliai	Playa; Los Lobos; Allo	
Chapadmalalan	Reptiles & amphibians	Rhinella loba	Chapadmalal	
Chapadmalalan	Reptiles & amphibians	Anura indet., Squamata indet., Serpentes indet.	Brochero	
Chapadmalalan	Reptiles & amphibians	Crocodylus falconensis	San; Gregorio	
Chapadmalalan	Reptiles & amphibians	Crocodylus sp., Alligatoridae indet., Crocodylidae indet., Podocnemididae indet.	Ware	
Chapadmalalan	Fishes	Carcharhinidae indet., Characidae indet., Cichlidae indet., Cynodontidae indet., Doradidae indet., Myliobatidae indet., Pimelodidae indet., Pristidae indet., Sciaenidae indet., Serrasalmidae indet., Sphyrnidae indet.	Ware	
Montehermosan	Mammals	Actenomys latidens, A. priscus, Argyrolagus palmeri, Caviodon australis, Doellotatus inornatus, Eleutherocercus antiquus, Eoauchenia primitiva, Eucelophorus cabrerai, Eumysops formosus, E. laeviplicatus, Holozaedyus laevisculptus, Hyperdidelphys inexpectata, Kraglievichimys formosus, Lagostomus euplasius, L. incises, Macrochorobates chapadmalensis, Marmosa contrerasi, Myrmecophaga caroloameghinoi, Necromys bonapartei, Notocynus hermosicus, Paedotherium bonaerense, P. typicum, Parahyaenodon argentinus, Paramyocastor diligens, Phugatherium cataclisticum, Phtoramys homogenidens, Pithanotomys columnaris, P. macer, Plaina cf. intermedia, Plohophorus figuratus, Promacrauchenia antiqua, P. kraglievichi, Proscelidodon patrius, Pseudoplataeomys formosus, Pseudotypotherium bravardi, Thylatheridium pascuali, Toxodon chapalmalensis, Tremacyllus impressus, Trigodon gaudryi, Caviodon sp., Chorobates sp., Lestodon sp., Lutreolina sp., Macroeuphractus sp., Neocavia sp., Neophanomys sp., Orthomyctera sp., Palaeocavia sp., Paleuphractus sp., Phugatherium sp., Prodolichotis sp., Pseudotypotherium sp., Sparassocynus sp., Caviidae indet., Cricetidae indet., Dasypodidae indet., Glyptodontidae indet., Macraucheniidae indet., Proterotheriidae indet., Rodentia indet., Sigmodontinae sp., Toxodontidae indet.	Monte; Hermoso	
Montehermosan	Mammals	Xotodon caravela	Aconquija	
Montehermosan	Mammals	Brachytherium laternarium, Cardiomys ameghinorum, Cavia cabrerai, Caviodon andalhualensis, Chapalmalania alteafrontis, Chorobates scalabrini, Cyonasua brevirostris, Eosclerocalyptus planus, Hemihegetotherium robustum, Microtragulus catamarcensis, Neophanomys biplicatus, Neotamandua conspicua, Orthomyctera andina, Palaeomyrmidon incomptus, Paradidelphys pattersonii, Paraeuphractus prominens, Phlyctaenopyga ameghinoi, Pithanotomys columnaris, Prodolichotis prisca, Promacrauchenia antiqua, Pyramiodontherium bergi, Scelidotherium pendolai, Sphenotherus zavaletianus, Stromaphorus compressidens, Tetrastylus intermedius, Tremacyllus latifrons, Typotheriopsis internum, Palaeocavia sp., Thylacosmilus sp., Toxodontherium sp., Xotodon sp.	Andalhuala	
Montehermosan	Mammals	Hemisyntrachelus sp.	Bahía; Inglesa	
Montehermosan	Mammals	Balaenopteridae indet., Odontoceti indet., Otariidae indet.	Caleta; Herradura	
Montehermosan	Mammals	Plesiotypotherium casirense, Simomylodon uccasamamensis	Casira	
Montehermosan	Mammals	Bolivartherium codorensis, Boreostemma pliocena, Falcontoxodon aguilerai, cf. Ischyrorhynchus vanbenedeni, Mirandabradys zabasi, Proeremotherium eljebe, Alitoxodon sp., Plesiomegatherium sp.	Codore	
Montehermosan	Mammals	Delphinus domeykoi, Megaptera hubachi, Pliopontos sp., ?Squalodon sp., Balaenidae indet.	Coquimbo	
Montehermosan	Mammals	Borhyaenidium riggsi	Corral; Quemado	
Montehermosan	Mammals	Posnanskytherium desaguaderoi, Macroeuphractus aff. moreni, Neosclerocalyptus sp., cf. Plohophorops sp., cf. Promacrauchenia sp.	La Paz	
Montehermosan	Mammals	Anadasypus aequatorianus, Caviomorpha indet., Litopterna indet., Toxodontia indet.	Letrero	
Montehermosan	Mammals	Cetacea indet.	Paraguaná	
Montehermosan	Mammals	Posnanskytherium sp., Promacrauchenia sp., Mylodontidae indet.	Remedios	
Montehermosan	Mammals	Plohophorus aff. figuratus	Río; Negro	
Montehermosan	Mammals	Oxyodontherium zeballosi	Río; Quinto	
Montehermosan	Mammals	Catonyx tarijensis	San José	
Montehermosan	Mammals	Aymaratherium jeani, Megatherium altiplanicum, Microtragulus bolivianus, Phugatherium saavedrai, Posnanskytherium desaguaderoi, Praectenomys rhombidens, P. vagus, Sparassocynus heterotopicus, Macroeuphractus sp., cf. Plaina sp., cf. Promacrauchenia sp., ?Caenolestidae indet., Mylodontinae indet.	Umala	
Montehermosan	Birds	Chunga incerta, Dryornis pampeanus, Eudromia cf. elegans, Foetopterus ambiguus, Mesembriornis milneedwardsi, Palaeociconia australis, Protorhea azarae, Tinamisornis intermedius, T. parvulus, Dendrocygninae indet.	Monte; Hermoso	
Montehermosan	Birds	Opisthodactylus kirchneri	Andalhuala	
Montehermosan	Birds	Pygoscelis grandis, Spheniscus anglicus	Bahía; Inglesa	
Montehermosan	Birds	Spheniscus chilensis, Milvago sp., Phalacrocorax sp.	Caleta; Herradura	
Montehermosan	Birds	cf. Palaeospheniscus sp., Spheniscus sp., Diomedeidae indet., Spheniscidae indet.	Coquimbo	
Montehermosan	Reptiles & amphibians	Ceratophrys ameghinorum, Chelonoidis cf. australis, Lepidobatrachus australis, L. laevis, Testudo formosa, Leptodactylus sp., Tupinambis sp., Bufonidae indet., Colubridae indet.	Monte; Hermoso	
Montehermosan	Reptiles & amphibians	Caiman sp., Gavialoidea indet.	Ipururo	
Montehermosan	Fishes	Characidae indet., Percichthyidae indet., Trichomycteridae indet.	Monte; Hermoso	
Montehermosan	Fishes	Carcharodon carcharias, Prionace glauca	Bahía; Inglesa	
Montehermosan	Fishes	Carcharodon carcharias, Carcharias sp., Carcharhinus sp., Chondrichthyes indet., Myliobatidae indet.	Caleta; Herradura	
Montehermosan	Fishes	Carcharodon carcharias	Coquimbo	
Montehermosan	Fishes	Megalodon, Brotula cf. ordwayi, Carcharhinus egertoni, Carcharhinus priscus, Chilara taylori, Eucinostomus cf. currani, Galeocerdo aduncus, Hemipristis serra, Isistius triangulus, Larimus cf. pacificus, Lepophidium microlepis, Merluccius cf. angustimanus, Negaprion eurybathrodon, Odontaspis acutissima, Orthopristis cf. cantharinus, Otophidium indefatigabile, Paraconger californiensis, Porichthys analis, P. margaritatus, P. cf. notatus, Rhizoprionodon taxandriae, Anchoa sp., Apogon sp., Citharichthys sp., Diaphus sp., Haemulon sp., Lampadena sp., Cynoglossidae indet., Gerreidae indet., Gobiidae indet., Opistognathidae indet., Pleuronectidae indet., ?Serranidae indet.	Onzole	
Montehermosan	Fishes	Megalodon	Paraguaná	
Montehermosan	Fishes	Megalodon, Carcharodon hastalis, Hexanchus griseus, Pristiophorus sp.	Puerta del Diablo	

== See also ==
- Biochronology
  - North American land mammal age (NALMA)
  - Asian land mammal age (ALMA)
  - European land mammal age (ELMA or ELMMZ)
  - African land mammal age (AFLMA)
- List of fossiliferous stratigraphic units in Colombia
- List of fossiliferous stratigraphic units in Ecuador
- List of fossiliferous stratigraphic units in Paraguay
- List of fossiliferous stratigraphic units in Uruguay
- List of fossiliferous stratigraphic units in Venezuela

== Notes and references ==
=== Bibliography ===
==== SALMA ====
- Flynn, J.; Swisher, C.C. (1995), "Cenozoic South American Land Mammal Ages: correlation to global geochronology", Geochronology Time Scales and Global Stratigraphic Correlation, SEPM Special Publication, 54: 317–333

Paleogene

- Gurovich, Yamila (2005), Bio-Evolutionary aspects of Mesozoic Mammals: Description, phylogenetic relationships and evolution of the Gondwanatheria, (Late Cretaceous and Paleocene of Gondwana) (PhD thesis), Universidad de Buenos Aires, pp. 1–621
- Woodburne, M.O.; Goin, F.J.; Bond, M.; Carlini, A.A.; Gelfo, J.N.; López, G.M.; Iglesias, A.; Zimicz, A.N. (2013), "Paleogene Land Mammal Faunas of South America; a Response to Global Climatic Changes and Indigenous Floral Diversity", Journal of Mammalian Evolution, 21: 1–73, doi:10.1007/s10914-012-9222-1, hdl:11336/31253

==== Pebas Wetlands ====
- Antoine, P.; Abello, J.A.; Adnet, S.; Altamirano Sierra, A.J.; Baby, P.; Billet, G.; Boivin, M.; Calderón, Y.; Candela and J. Chabain, F. Corfu, D. A. Croft, M. Ganerød, C. Jaramillo, S. Klaus, L. Marivaux, R. E. Navarrete, M. J. Orliac, F. Parra, M. E. Pérez, F. Pujos, J. Rage, Anthony Ravel, Céline Robinet, Martin Roddaz, Julia Victoria Tejada Lara, Jorge Vélez-Juarbe, Frank P. Wesselingh and Rodolfo Salas Gismondi, A.R. (2016), "A 60-million-year Cenozoic history of western Amazonian ecosystems in Contamana, eastern Peru" (PDF), Gondwana Research, 31: 30–59, Bibcode:2016GondR..31...30A, doi:10.1016/j.gr.2015.11.001
- Salas Gismondi, Rodolfo; Flynn, John J.; Baby, Patrice; Tejada Lara, Julia V.; Wesselingh, Frank P.; Antoine, Pierre-Olivier (2015), "A Miocene hyperdiverse crocodylian community reveals peculiar trophic dynamics in proto-Amazonian mega-wetlands", Proceedings of the Royal Society B: Biological Sciences, 282 (1804) 20142490, doi:10.1098/rspb.2014.2490, PMC 4375856, PMID 25716785
- Wesselingh, F.P.; Hoorn, M.C.; Guerrero, J.; Räsänen, M.E.; Romero Pittmann, L.; Salo, J. (2006), "The stratigraphy and regional structure of Miocene deposits in western Amazonia (Peru, Colombia and Brazil), with implications for late Neogene landscape evolution", Scripta Geologica, 133: 291–322

==== Argentina ====
Paleogene

- Vucetich, María F. (2007), "Mamíferos continentales del Paleógeno argentino: las investigaciones de los últimos cincuenta años", Asociación Paleontológica Argentina. Publicación Especial, 11: 239–255

Pleistocene

- Iriondo, Martín (2010), Geología del Cuaternario en la Argentina, Museo Provincial de Ciencias Naturales Florentino Ameghino, pp. 1–360

Austral Basin

- Dal Molín, C.N.; Colombo, F. (2003), "Sedimentación neógena en la Cuenca del Río Zeballos y del Río Jeinemeni (47° Latitud Sur) Antepaís patagónico Argentina" (PDF), Geogaceta, 34: 139–142
- Pérez Panera, Juan Pablo (2010), Sistemática y bioestratigrafía de los nanofósiles calcáreos del Cretácico del sudeste de la Cuenca Austral, Santa Cruz, Argentina (PhD thesis), Universidad Nacional de La Plata, pp. 1–450

Santa María-Hualfín Basin

- Bonini, Ricardo Adolfo (2014), Bioestratigrafía y diversidad de los mamíferos del Neógeno de San Fernando y Puerta de Corral Quemado (Catamarca, Argentina) (PhD thesis) (PDF), Universidad Nacional de La Plata, pp. 1–337
- Muruaga, Claudia M (2001), "Estratigrafía y desarrollo tectosedimentario de los sedimentos terciarios en los alrededores de la Sierra de Hualfín, borde suroriental de la Puna, Catamarca, Argentina" (PDF), Latin American Journal of Sedimentology and Basin Analysis, 8: 27–50

Santa Fe Province

- Vezzosi, Raúl Ignacio (2015), Diversidad de los mamíferos del Pleistoceno de la Provincia de Santa Fe, Argentina: aspectos taxonómicos, bioestratigráficos y paleobiogeográficos relacionados (PhD thesis) (PDF), Universidad Nacional de La Plata, pp. 1–913

Aconquija Formation

- Armella, Matías A.; García López, Daniel A.; Dominguez, Lucía (2018), "A new species of Xotodon (Notoungulata, Toxodontidae) from northwestern Argentina", Journal of Vertebrate Paleontology, 38 (1) e1425882, Bibcode:2018JVPal..38E5882A, doi:10.1080/02724634.2017.1425882, hdl:11336/87945
- Gutiérrez, A.A.; Mon, Ricardo (2004), "Mega-geomorphology of Tafi del Valle-Aconquija, Tucumán", Revista de la Asociación Geológica Argentina, 59: 303–311
- Nasif, Norma L.; Estebán, Graciela; Georgieff, Sergio M. (2007), "Nuevo registro de vertebrados para la Formación Aconquija, provincia de Catamarca, Noroeste de Argentina. Implicancias cronoestratigráficas y consideraciones paleoambientales" (PDF), Acta Geológica Lilloana, 20: 99–112

Agua de la Piedra Formation

- Cerdeño, Esperanza; Reguero, Marcelo (2015), "The Hegetotheriidae (Mammalia, Notoungulata) assemblage from the late Oligocene of Mendoza, central-western Argentina", Journal of Vertebrate Paleontology, 35 (2) e907173, Bibcode:2015JVPal..35E7173C, doi:10.1080/02724634.2014.907173, hdl:11336/48566
- Cerdeño, Esperanza; Vera, Bárbara (2014), "A new Leontiniidae (Notoungulata) from the Late Oligocene beds of Mendoza Province, Argentina", Journal of Systematic Palaeontology, 13 (11): 943–962, doi:10.1080/14772019.2014.982727, hdl:11336/59428
- Combina, Ana María; Nullo, Francisco (2011), "Ciclos tectónicos, volcánicos y sedimentarios del Cenozoico del sur de Mendoza-Argentina (35-37° S y 69° 30'W)" (PDF), Andean Geology, 38: 198–218
- Hernández Del Pino, Santiago; Seoane, Federico D.; Cerdeño, Esperanza (2017), "New postcranial remains of large toxodontian notoungulates from the late Oligocene of Mendoza, Argentina and their systematic implications" (PDF), Acta Palaeontologica Polonica, 62: 195–210
- Seoane, Federico; Cerdeño, Esperanza (2014), "First extra-Patagonian record of Asmodeus Ameghino (Notoungulata, Homalodotheriidae) in the Late Oligocene of Mendoza Province, Argentina", Ameghiniana, 51 (5): 373–384, Bibcode:2014Amegh..51..373S, doi:10.5710/AMGH.07.07.2014.2735, hdl:11336/32604

Aisol Formation

- Forasiepi, Analía M.; Cerdeño, Esperanza; Bond, Mariano; Schmidt, Gabriela I.; Naipauer, Maximiliano; Straehl, Fiona R.; Martinelli, Agustín G.; Garrido, Alberto C.; Schmitz and James L. Crowley, Mark D. (2015), "New toxodontid (Notoungulata) from the Early Miocene of Mendoza, Argentina", Paläontologische Zeitschrift, 89 (3): 611–634, Bibcode:2015PalZ...89..611F, doi:10.1007/s12542-014-0233-5, hdl:11336/20443
- Forasiepi, Analía M.; Martinelli, Agustín G.; De la Fuente, Marcelo S.; Dieguez, Sergio; Bond, Mariano (2011), Paleontology and stratigraphy of the Aisol Formation (Neogene), San Rafael, Mendoza (PDF), Cenozoic Geology of the Central Andes of Argentina, SCS Publisher, Salta, pp. 135–154

Andalhuala Formation

- Candela, Adriana M.; Bonini, Ricardo A. (2017), "A new guinea pig (Rodentia, Caviomorpha) from northwestern Argentina: Implications for the origin of the genus Cavia", Journal of Vertebrate Paleontology, 37 (4) e1352591, Bibcode:2017JVPal..37E2591C, doi:10.1080/02724634.2017.1352591, hdl:11336/58708

Andesitas Huancache Formation

- Goin, Francisco J.; Tejedor, Marcelo F.; Chornogubsky, Laura; López, Guillermo M.; Gelfo, Javier N.; Bond, Mariano; Woodburne, Michael O.; Gurovich, Yamila; Reguero, Marcelo (2012), "Persistence of a Mesozoic, non-therian mammalian lineage (Gondwanatheria) in the mid-Paleogene of Patagonia", Naturwissenschaften, 99 (6): 449–463, Bibcode:2012NW.....99..449G, doi:10.1007/s00114-012-0919-z, hdl:11336/272154, PMID 22584426
- Tejedor, Marcelo F. (2009), "New Early Eocene Mammalian Fauna from Western Patagonia, Argentina" (PDF), American Museum Novitates (3638): 1–43, doi:10.1206/577.1, hdl:11336/101832

Arroyo Chasicó Formation

- González Ruiz, Laureano R.; Scillato Yané, Gustavo J.; Krmpotic, Cecilia M.; Carlini, Alfredo A. (2012), "A new species of Peltephilidae (Mammalia: Xenarthra: Cingulata) from the late Miocene (Chasicoan SALMA) of Argentina" (PDF), Zootaxa, 3359: 55–64
- Pérez, María Encarnación; Deschamps, Cecilia M.; Vucetich, María Guiomar (2018), "Diversity, phylogeny and biogeography of the South American 'cardiomyine' rodents (Hystricognathi, Cavioidea) with a description of two new species", Papers in Palaeontology, 4 (1): 1–19, Bibcode:2018PPal....4....1P, doi:10.1002/spp2.1095, hdl:11336/42361
- Rasia, Luciano L.; Candela, Adriana M. (2016), "Lagostomus telenkechanum, sp. nov., a new lagostomine rodent (Caviomorpha, Chinchillidae) from the Arroyo Chasicó Formation (late Miocene; Buenos Aires Province, Argentina)", Journal of Vertebrate Paleontology, 37 (1) e1239205, doi:10.1080/02724634.2017.1239205, hdl:11336/72389

Belgrano Formation

- Agnolin, Federico (2006), "Dos nuevos Anatidae (Aves, Anseriformes) del Pleistoceno inferior-medio de Argentina", Stud. Geol. Salmant., 42: 81–95

Bororó Formation

- Scarfati, L.; Melendi, D.L.; Volkheimer, W. (2009), "A Danian subtropical lacustrine palynobiota from South America (Bororó Formation, San Jorge Basin, Patagonia - Argentina)", Geologica Acta, 7: 35–61

Brochero Formation

- Barbière, Franck; Cruz, Laura E.; Ortiz, Pablo E.; Pardiñas, Ulyses F. J. (2016), "A new genus of Sigmodontinae (Mammalia, Rodentia, Cricetidae) from the Pliocene of Central Argentina", Journal of Vertebrate Paleontology, 36 (5) e1199557, Bibcode:2016JVPal..36E9557B, doi:10.1080/02724634.2016.1199557, hdl:11336/36864
- Zamorano, Martin (2013), "Diagnosis y nueva descripción de Propanochthus bullifer (Burmeister) (Xenarthra, Glyptodontidae). Consideraciones bioestratigráficas y cronológicas de su procedencia" (PDF), Spanish Journal of Palaeontology, 28 (2): 283–292, doi:10.7203/sjp.28.2.17860

Casamayor Formation

- Raigemborn, María Sol; Krause, Javier M.; Bellosi, Eduardo; Matheos, Sergio D. (2010), "Redefinición estratigráfica del Grupo Río Chico (Paleógeno Superior), en el norte de la Cuenca del Golfo San Jorge, Chubut" (PDF), Revista de la Asociación Geológica Argentina, 67: 239–256
- Raigemborn, María Sol (2008), Estudio estratigráfico, sedimentológico y composicional de las sedimentitas del Terciário inferior (Grupo Rio Chico) en el sector sudoriental del Chubut Extraandino (PhD thesis) (PDF), Universidad Nacional de La Plata, pp. 11–58

Cerro Azul Formation

- Goin, F.J.; Montalvo, C.; Visconti, G. (2000), "Los marsupiales (Mammalia) del Mioceno superior de la Formación Cerro Azul (Provincia de La Pampa, Argentina)", Estudios Geológicos, 56 (1–2): 101–126, Bibcode:2000EstGM..56..101G, doi:10.3989/egeol.00561-2158, hdl:11336/108700
- Madozzo Jaén, M. Carolina; Pérez, M. Encarnación; Montalvo, Claudia I.; Tomassini, Rodrigo L. (2018), "Systematic review of Neocavia from the Neogene of Argentina: Phylogenetic and evolutionary implications" (PDF), Acta Palaeontologica Polonica, 63 (2): 241–260
- Sostillo, Renata; Montalvo, Claudia I.; Verzi, Diego H. (2014), "A new species of Reigechimys (Rodentia, Echimyidae) from the Late Miocene of central Argentina and the evolutionary pattern of the lineage", Ameghiniana, 51 (4): 284–294, Bibcode:2014Amegh..51..284S, doi:10.5710/AMGH.24.04.2014.2741, hdl:11336/9150

Cerro Bandera Formation

- Kramarz, Alejandro G.; Bond, Mariano; Arnal, Michelle (2015), "Systematic description of three new mammals (Notoungulata and Rodentia) from the early Miocene Cerro Bandera Formation, northern Patagonia, Argentina", Ameghiniana, 52 (6): 585–597, Bibcode:2015Amegh..52..585K, doi:10.5710/AMGH.27.06.2015.2906, hdl:11336/47331
- Kramarz, Alejandro; Garrido, Alberto; Forasiepi, Analía; Bond, Mariano; Tambussi, Claudia (2005), "Estratigrafia y vertebrados (Aves y Mammalia) de la Formación Cerro Bandera, Mioceno Temprano de la Provincia del Neuquén, Argentina", Revista Geológica de Chile, 32 (2): 273–291, doi:10.4067/S0716-02082005000200006

Chapadmalal Formation

- Elissamburu, Andrea; Dondas, Alejandro; de Santis, Luciano (2011), "Morfometría de las paleocuevas de la "Fm." Chapadmalal y su asignación a Actenomys (Rodentia), Paedotherium (Notoungulata) y otros mamíferos fósiles hospedantes" (PDF), Mastozoología Neotropical, 18: 227–238
- Oliva, Cristian; Zurita, Alfredo Eduardo; Dondas, Alejandro; Scillato Yané, Gustavo Juan (2010), "Los Glyptodontinae (Xenarthra, Glyptodontidae) del Piso/Edad Chapadmalalense (Plioceno tardío): revisión y aportes a su conocimiento" (PDF), Revista Mexicana de Ciencias Geológicas, 27: 112–120
- Olivares, A. Itatí; Verzi, Diego H.; Guiomar Vucetich, M. (2012), "Definición del género Eumysops Ameghino 1888 (Rodentia, Echimyidae) y sistemática de las especies del Plioceno temprano de la Argentina central" (PDF), Ameghiniana, 49 (2): 198–216, Bibcode:2012Amegh..49..198O, doi:10.5710/AMGH.v49i2(450)
- Pérez Ben, Celeste M.; Gómez, Raúl O.; Báez, Ana M. (2019), "A new Pliocene true toad (Anura: Bufonidae): first record of an extinct species from South America", Journal of Vertebrate Paleontology, 39 (1) e1576183, Bibcode:2019JVPal..39E6183P, doi:10.1080/02724634.2019.1576183

Chichinales Formation

- Agnolin, Federico L.; Chafrat, Pablo (2015), "New fossil bird remains from the Chichinales Formation (Early Miocene) of northern Patagonia, Argentina", Annales de Paléontologie, 101 (2): 87–94, Bibcode:2015AnPal.101...87A, doi:10.1016/j.annpal.2015.02.001
- Kramarz, Alejandro Gustavo; Paz, Ernesto Rodrigo (2013), "Un Hegetotheriidae (Mammalia, Notoungulata) basal del Mioceno temprano de Patagonia" (PDF), Revista Mexicana de Ciencias Geológicas, 30: 186–195

Chiquimil Formation

- Esteban, G.; Nasif, N.; Georgieff, S.M. (2014), "Cronobioestratigrafía del Mioceno tardío – Plioceno temprano, Puerta de Corral Quemado y Villavil, provincia de Catamarca, Argentina" (PDF), Acta Geológica Lilloana, 26: 165–192
- Madozzo Jaén, María Carolina; Pérez, María Encarnación (2017), "The most ancient caviine rodent (Hystricognathi, Cavioidea) comes from the late Miocene of Northwest Argentina (South America)", Historical Biology, 29 (3): 376–383, Bibcode:2017HBio...29..376M, doi:10.1080/08912963.2016.1166360, hdl:11336/61885
- Martínez, Leandro C.A.; Lutz, Alicia I. (2004), Estudios preliminares de la xiloflora de la Formación Chiquimil (Catamarca) (PDF), Universidad Nacional del Nordeste - Comunicaciones Científicas y Tecnológicas, pp. 1–3
- Mautino, Lilia R.; Anzótegui, Luisa M., Polen de la Formación Chiquimil, en la Localidad Vallecito (Mioceno Superior) Provincia de Catamarca (PDF), Universidad Nacional del Nordeste, pp. 1–3
- Morton, L.S.; Herbst, R., Gastrópodos (Orthalicidae) de la Formación Chiquimil (Mioceno) de Villavil, Provincia de Catamarca, Argentina (PDF), Universidad Nacional del Nordeste, pp. 1–3

Collón Curá Formation

- Abello, María Alejandra; Rubilar Rogers, David (2012), "Revisión del género Abderites Ameghino, 1887 (Marsupialia, Paucituberculata)", Ameghiniana, 49 (2): 164–184, Bibcode:2012Amegh..49..164A, doi:10.5710/AMGH.v49i2(408)
- Dalla Salda, Luis; Franzese, Juan (2014), "Las megaestructuras del Macizo y Cordillera Norpatagónica argentina y la génesis de las cuencas volcano-sedimentarias terciarias", Revista Geológica de Chile, 31: 3–13
- Escosteguy, Leonardo; Franchi, Mario (2010), "Estratigrafía de la región de Chapelco, Provincia del Neuquén" (PDF), Revista de la Asociación Geológica Argentina, 66: 418–429
- Nardoni, Bárbara Vera; Reguero, Marcelo; González Ruiz, Laureano (2017), "The Interatheriinae notoungulates from the middle Miocene Collón Curá Formation in Argentina", Acta Palaeontologica Polonica, 62 (4): 845–863

Deseado Formation

- Agnolin, Federico (2006), "Posición sistemática de algunas aves fororracoideas (Ralliformes: Cariamae) Argentinas", Revista del Museo de Ciencias Naturales, 8: 27–33, doi:10.22179/REVMACN.8.348
- Forasiepi, Analía M.; Babot, M. Judith; Zimicz, Natalia (2014), "Australohyaena antiqua (Mammalia, Metatheria, Sparassodonta), a large predator from the Late Oligocene of Patagonia", Journal of Systematic Palaeontology, 13 (6): 503–525, doi:10.1080/14772019.2014.926403, hdl:11336/59430

Divisadero Largo Formation

- Simpson, G.G.; Minoprio, J.L.; Patterson, B. (1962), "The mammalian fauna of the Divisadero Largo Formation, Mendoza, Argentina", Bulletin of the Museum of Comparative Zoology, 127: 239–293

La Ensenada Formation

- Góis, Flávio; González Ruiz, Laureano Raúl; Scillato Yané, Gustavo Juan; Soibelzon, Esteban (2015), "A Peculiar New Pampatheriidae (Mammalia: Xenarthra: Cingulata) from the Pleistocene of Argentina and Comments on Pampatheriidae Diversity", PLoS ONE, 10 (6) e0128296, Bibcode:2015PLoSO..1028296G, doi:10.1371/journal.pone.0128296, PMC 4470999, PMID 26083486
- Picasso, Mariana B.J.; Degrange, Federico J. (2009), "El género Nothura (Aves, Tinamidae) en el Pleistoceno (Formación Ensenada) de la provincia de Buenos Aires, Argentina", Revista Mexicana de Ciencias Geológicas, 26: 428–432
- Tonni, E.P. (1999), "The Ensenada and Buenos Aires formations (Pleistocene) in a quarry near La Plata, Argentina" (PDF), Journal of South American Earth Sciences, 12 (3): 273–291, Bibcode:1999JSAES..12..273T, doi:10.1016/S0895-9811(99)00021-8

Las Flores Formation, Sierra del Tontal

- Cerdeño, Esperanza; Pérez, María E.; Deschamps, Cecilia M.; Contreras, Víctor H. (2019), "A new capybara from the late Miocene of San Juan Province, Argentina, and its phylogenetic implications" (PDF), Acta Palaeontologica Polonica, 64: 1–14

Las Flores Formation, Golfo San Jorge Basin

- Goin, F. J.; Candela, A.M.; Abello, M.A.; Oliveira, E.V. (2009), "Earliest South American paucituberculatans and their significance in the understanding of 'pseudodiprotodont' marsupial radiations", Zoological Journal of the Linnean Society, 155 (4): 867–884, doi:10.1111/j.1096-3642.2008.00471.x
- Raigemborn, María Sol; Krause, Javier M.; Bellosi, Eduardo; Matheos, Sergio D. (2010), "Redefinición estratigráfica del Grupo Río Chico (Paleógeno Superior), en el norte de la Cuenca del Golfo San Jorge, Chubut" (PDF), Revista de la Asociación Geológica Argentina, 67: 239–256
- Ugalde, Raúl; Bostelmann, Enrique; Oyarzún, José Luis (2013), Stratigraphic review of the Las Flores Formation, Sierra Baguales, Última Esperanza Province, Magallanes, GeoSur Conference IV Viña del Mar, pp. 355–358

Fortín Tres Pozos Formation

- Soibelzon, Leopoldo Héctor (2010), "Primer registro fósil de Procyon cancrivorus (G. Cuvier, 1798) (Carnivora, Procyonidae) en la Argentina" (PDF), Revista Mexicana de Ciencias Geológicas, 27: 313–319
- Zurita, Alfredo Eduardo; Miño Boilini, Ángel Ramón; Carlini, Alfredo Armando; Iriondo, Martín; Alcaraz, María Alejandra (2009), "Paleontología del Chaco Oriental. Una nueva localidad con mamíferos fósiles pleistocenos en el río Bermejo (Formosa, Argentina)" (PDF), Revista Mexicana de Ciencias Geológicas, 26: 277–288

Gaiman Formation

- Acosta Hospitaleche, Carolina (2007), "Revisión sistemática de Palaeospheniscus biloculata (Simpson) nov. comb. (Aves, Spheniscidae) de la Formación Gaiman (Mioceno Temprano), Chubut, Argentina", Ameghiniana, 44: 417–426
- Viglino, Mariana; Buono, Mónica R.; Gutstein, Carolina S.; Cozzuol, Mario A.; Cuitiño, José I. (2018), "A new dolphin from the early Miocene of Patagonia, Argentina: Insights into the evolution of Platanistoidea in the Southern Hemisphere" (PDF), Acta Palaeontologica Polonica, 63 (2): 261–277, doi:10.4202/app.00441.2017

Geste Formation

- Ciancio, Martín R; Herrera, Claudia; Aramayo, Alejandro; Payrola, Patricio; Babot, Judith (2016), "Diversity of cingulate xenarthrans in the middle–late Eocene of Northwestern Argentina" (PDF), Acta Palaeontologica Polonica, 61 (3): 575–590, Bibcode:2016AcPaP..61..575C, doi:10.4202/app.00208.2015
- García López, D.A.; Babot, M.J. (2014), "Notoungulate faunas of north-western Argentina: new findings of early-diverging forms from the Eocene Geste Formation", Journal of Systematic Palaeontology, 13 (7): 557–579, doi:10.1080/14772019.2014.930527
- López, Guillermo; Bond, Mariano (1995), "Un nuevo Notopithecinae (Notoungulata, Typotheria) del Terciario Inferior de la Puna argentina [A new Notopithecinae (Notoungulata, Typotheria) of Lower Tertiary from the argentinian Puna]", STVD. Geol. Salmant., 31: 87–99

Gran Bajo del Gualicho Formation

- Reichler, Valeria A (2010), "Estratigrafía y paleontología del Cenozoico marino del Gran Bajo y Salinas del Gualicho, Argentina, y descripción de 17 especies nuevas" (PDF), Andean Geology, 31: 177–219

Hernandarias Formation

- Segovia, Román (2014), Micropaleontología del Cuaternario del sector austral del litoral, Argentina (PhD thesis) (PDF), Universidad Nacional de La Plata, pp. 1–372

Huayquerías Formation

- Forasiepi, Analía M.; MacPhee, Ross D.E.; Hernández del Pino, Santiago; Schmidt, Gabriela I.; Amson, Eli; Grohé, Camille (2016), "Exceptional skull of Huayqueriana (Mammalia, Litopterna, Macraucheniidae) from the Late Miocene of Argentina: anatomy, systematics and paleobiological implications" (PDF), Bulletin of the American Museum of Natural History, 404: 1–76, doi:10.1206/0003-0090-404.1.1
- Garrido, Alberto C.; Bonini, Ricardo; Barbeau, David L. (2017), Paleoambiente, edad y vertebrados de la Formación Huayquerías, Mioceno tardio, Provincia de Mendoza, Republica Argentina, XX Congreso Geológico Argentino, pp. 50–55

Huitrera Formation

- Escosteguy, Leonardo; Franchi, Mario (2010), "Estratigrafía de la región de Chapelco, Provincia del Neuquén" (PDF), Revista de la Asociación Geológica Argentina, 66: 418–429

India Muerta Formation

- García López, Daniel A.; Barbot, M. Judith (2015), "A late Miocene Argyrolagidae (Mammalia, Metatheria, Bonapartheriiformes) from northwestern Argentina", Ameghiniana, 52 (3): 314–323, Bibcode:2015Amegh..52..314G, doi:10.5710/AMGH.17.02.2015.2876, hdl:11336/50746

La Invernada Formation

- Combina, Ana María; Sánchez, María Lidia (2003), "Análisis sedimentológico de la Formación La Invernada, Pleistoceno Tardío-Holoceno, pedemonte de las Sierras de Comechingones, Provincia de Córdoba, Argentina" (PDF), Revista Asociación Argentina de Sedimentología, 10: 123–135

Ituzaingó Formation

- Brandoni, Diego (2014), "A new genus of Megalonychidae (Mammalia, Xenarthra) from the Late Miocene of Argentina", Revista Brasileira de Paleontologia, 17 (1): 33–42, Bibcode:2014RvBrP..17...33B, doi:10.4072/rbp.2014.1.04, hdl:11336/18955
- Franco, María Jimena; Brea, Mariana; Orfeo, Óscar; Zucol, Alejandro F. (2013), "La paleoflora de la Formación Ituzaingó, Argentina" (PDF), El Neógeno de la Mesopotamia argentina, Asociación Paleontológica Argentina, Publicación Especial, 14: 41–55
- Scillato Yané, Gustavo J.; Góis, Flávio; Zurita, Alfredo E.; Carlini, Alfredo A.; González Ruiz, Laureano R.; Krmpotic, Cecilia M.; Oliva, Cristian; Zamorano, Martín (2013), "Los Cingulata (Mammalia, Xenarthra) del "Conglomerado Osífero" (Miocene tardío) de la Formación Ituzaingó de Entre Ríos, Argentina" (PDF), Revista de la Asociación Paleontológica Argentina Publicación Especial, 14: 118–134

Koluel Kaike Formation

- Raigemborn, María Sol; Krause, Javier M.; Bellosi, Eduardo; Matheos, Sergio D. (2010), "Redefinición estratigráfica del Grupo Río Chico (Paleógeno inferior), en el norte de la Cuenca del Golfo San Jorge, Chubut" (PDF), Revista de la Asociación Geológica Argentina, 67: 239–256

Laguna Brava Formation

- Vizán, H.; Geuna, S.; Melchor, R.; Bellosi, E.S.; Lagorio, S.L.; Vásquez, C.; Japas, M.S.; Ré, G.; Do Campo, M. (2013), "Geological setting and paleomagnetism of the Eocene red beds of Laguna Brava Formation (Quebrada Santo Domingo, northwestern Argentina)", Tectonophysics, 583: 105–123, Bibcode:2013Tectp.583..105V, doi:10.1016/j.tecto.2012.10.026, hdl:11336/84532

Laguna del Hunco Formation

- Wilf, Peter; Johnson, Kirk R.; Cúneo, N. Rubén; Smith, M. Elliot; Singer, Bradley S.; Gandolfo, Maria A. (2005), "Eocene Plant Diversity at Laguna del Hunco and Río Pichileufú, Patagonia, Argentina" (PDF), The American Naturalist, 135 (6): 634–650, Bibcode:2005ANat..165..634W, doi:10.1086/430055, PMID 15937744

Lefipán Formation

- Goin, Francisco & Rosendo Pascual, Marcelo F. Tejedor, Javier N. Gelfo, Michael O. Woodburne, Judd A. Case, Marcelo A. Reguero, Mariano Bond, Guillermo M. López, Alberto L. Cione, Daniel Udrizar Sautheir, Lucía Balarino, Roberto A. Scassos, Francisco A. Medina and María C. Ubaldón (2006), "The earliest Tertiary therian mammal from South America", Journal of Vertebrate Paleontology, 26 (2): 505–510, doi:10.1671/0272-4634(2006)26[505:TETTMF]2.0.CO;2

Leticia Formation

- Clarke, J.A.; Olivero, E.B.; Puerta, P. (2003), "Description of the earliest fossil penguin from South America, and first Paleogene vertebrate locality of Tierra del Fuego, Argentina" (PDF), American Museum Novitates (3423): 1–18, doi:10.1206/0003-0082(2003)423<0001:DOTEFP>2.0.CO;2, hdl:11336/94973

Loma de Las Tapias Formation

- Deschamps, Cecilia M.; Vieytes, Emma C.; Olivares, A. Itatí; Vucetich, María G. (2009), "Primer registro de Cardiatherium chasicoense (Rodentia, Hydrochoeridae) fuera del área pampeana (Argentina) y su valor bioestratigráfico", Ameghiniana, 46: 295–305
- Mones, Álvaro (2014), "Contrerascynus, new name for Simpsonia Contreras, 1990 (Mammalia, Sparassodonta, Hathlyacynidae), non Rochebrune, 1904 (Bivalvia, Unionidae), non Baker, 1911 (Gastropoda, Lymnaeidae)" (PDF), Revista Brasileira de Paleontologia, 17 (3): 435–436, Bibcode:2014RvBrP..17..435M, doi:10.4072/rbp.2014.3.12
- Olivares, A. Itatí; Verzi, Diego H.; Contreras, Victor H.; Pessôa, Leila (2016), "A new Echimyidae (Rodentia, Hystricomorpha) from the late Miocene of southern South America", Journal of Vertebrate Paleontology, 37 (1) e1239204, doi:10.1080/02724634.2017.1239204, hdl:11336/56402

Luján Formation

- Blasi, Adriana (2010), "Paleoambientes de la cuenca media del Río Luján (Buenos Aires, Argentina) durante el último periodo glacial (EIO 4-2)" (PDF), Latin American Journal of Sedimentology and Basin Analysis, 17: 85–111
- Fucks, Enrique; Blasi, Adriana; Carbonari, Jorge; Huarte, Roberto; Pisano, Florencia; Aguirre, Marina (2011), "Evolución geológica y geomorfológica de la cuenca del Río Areco, NE de la Provincia de Buenos Aires" (PDF), Revista de la Asociación Geológica Argentina, 68: 109–120

Lumbrera Formation

- Deraco, Virginia; García López, Daniel A. (2015), "A new Eocene Toxodontia (Mammalia, Notoungulata) from northwestern Argentina", Journal of Vertebrate Paleontology, 36 (1) e1037884, doi:10.1080/02724634.2015.1037884, hdl:11336/45566
- Herrera, Claudia M. R.; Powell, Jaime E.; Esteban, Graciela I.; Del Papa, Cecilia (2017), "A New Eocene Dasypodid with Caniniforms (Mammalia, Xenarthra, Cingulata) from Northwest Argentina", Journal of Mammalian Evolution, 24 (3): 275–288, doi:10.1007/s10914-016-9345-x, hdl:11336/61883
- Del Papa, Cecilia E (2006), "Estratigrafía y paleoambientes de la Formación Lumbrera, Grupo Salta, Noroeste argentino" (PDF), Revista de la Asociación Geológica Argentina, 61: 313–327

Maimará Formation

- Abello, María Alejandra; De los Reyes, Martín; Candela, Adriana Magdalena; Pujos, François; Voglino, Damián; Mamani Quispe, Bernardino (2015), "Description of a new species of Sparassocynus (Marsupialia: Didelphoidea: Sparassocynidae) from the late Miocene of Jujuy (Argentina) and taxonomic review of Sparassocynus heterotopicus from the Pliocene of Bolivia", Zootaxa, 3937 (1): 147–160, doi:10.11646/zootaxa.3937.1.7, hdl:11336/48565, PMID 25947465
- Bonini, Ricardo A.; Schmidt, Gabriela I.; Reguero, Marcelo A.; Cerdeño, Esperanza; Candela, Adriana M.; Solís, Natalia (2017), "First record of Toxodontidae (Mammalia, Notoungulata) from the late Miocene–early Pliocene of the southern central Andes, NW Argentina", Journal of Paleontology, 91 (3): 566–576, Bibcode:2017JPal...91..566B, doi:10.1017/jpa.2016.160, hdl:11336/49805
- Pujos, François; Candela, Adriana; Galli, Claudia I.; Coiras, Beatriz L.; Reguero, Marcelo A.; de los Reyes, Martín; Abello, María Alejandra (2012), "The Scelidotherine Proscelidodon (Xenarthra: Mylodontidae) from the Late Miocene of Maimará (Northwestern Argentina, Jujuy Province)" (PDF), Ameghiniana, 49 (4): 668–674, Bibcode:2012Amegh..49..668P, doi:10.5710/AMGH.20.11.2012.593

Maíz Gordo Formation

- Narváez, Paula Liliana (2009), Palinoestratigrafía, paleoambientes y cambios climáticos durante el Cretácico final y Paleógeno de la Cuenca del Grupo Salta, República Argentina (PhD thesis) (PDF), Universidad Nacional de Salta, pp. 1–229

Mariño Formation

- Cerdeño, Esperanza; Vera, Bárbara; Combina, Ana María (2018), "A new early Miocene Mesotheriidae (Notoungulata) from the Mariño Formation (Argentina): Taxonomic and biostratigraphic implications", Journal of South American Earth Sciences, 88: 118–131, Bibcode:2018JSAES..88..118C, doi:10.1016/j.jsames.2018.06.016, hdl:11336/158508
- Cerdeño, Esperanza; Guiomar Vucetich, M. (2007), "The first rodent from the Mariño Formation (Miocene) at Divisadero Largo (Mendoza, Argentina) and its biochronological implications" (PDF), Andean Geology, 34: 199–207, doi:10.5027/andgeoV34n2-a02

Mealla Formation

- Sánchez, María Cristina; Marquillas, Rosa A. (2010), "Facies y ambientes del Grupo Salta (Cretácico-Paleógeno) en Tumbaya, Quebrada de Humahuaca, Provincia de Jujuy" (PDF), Revista de la Asociación Geológica Argentina, 67: 383–391

Miramar & San Andrés Formations

- Gaudioso, P.J.; Gasparini, G.M.; Herbst, R.; Bárquez, R.M. (2017), "First record of the Neolicaphrium recens Frenguelli, 1921 (Mammalia, Litopterna) in the Pleistocene of Santiago del Estero Province, Argentina" (PDF), Papéis Avulsos de Zoologia, 57 (3): 23–29, doi:10.11606/0031-1049.2017.57.03
- Isla, Federico; Taglioretti, Matías; Dondas, Alejandro (2015), "Revisión y nuevos aportes sobre la estratigrafía y sedimentología de los acantilados entre Mar de Cobo y Miramar, Provincia de Buenos Aires" (PDF), Revista de la Asociación Geológica Argentina, 72: 235–250
- Olivares, A.I.; Verzi, D.H. (2015), "Systematics, phylogeny and evolutionary pattern of the hystricognath rodent Eumysops (Echimyidae) from the Plio–Pleistocene of southern South America", Historical Biology: An International Journal of Paleobiology, 27 (8): 1042–1061, Bibcode:2015HBio...27.1042O, doi:10.1080/08912963.2014.929672, hdl:11336/53846

Monte Hermoso Formation

- Agnolin, Federico L.; Bogan, Sergio; Tomassini, Rodrigo L.; Manera, Teresa (2014), "Nuevo Percichthyidae (Teleostei, Percoidei) del Plioceno temprano de la provincia de Buenos Aires (Argentina) y sus implicancias biogeográficas" (PDF), Revista del Museo de Ciencias Naturales, 16: 19–31, doi:10.22179/REVMACN.16.159
- Albino, Adriana M.; Rodrigo, Tomassini; Brizuela, Santiago (2009), "Presencia del lagarto teiido Tupinambis en la FormaciónMonte Hermoso de Farola Monte Hermoso, sur de la provincia de Buenos Aires (Argentina)", Ameghiniana, 46: 177–187
- Barbière, Franck; Ortiz, Pablo E.; Pardiñas, Ulyses F.J. (2019), "The oldest sigmodontine rodent revisited and the age of the first South American cricetids", Journal of Paleontology, 93 (2): 368–384, Bibcode:2019JPal...93..368B, doi:10.1017/jpa.2018.74
- Bogan, Sergio; Agnolin, Federico L. (2009), "Primer registro fósil de la familia Trichomycteridae (Teleostei: Siluriformes; Plioceno) en la Formación Monte Hermoso, Argentina" (PDF), Revista del Museo de Ciencias Naturales, 11: 193–198, doi:10.22179/REVMACN.11.259
- Nicoli, Laura (2015), "New fossil species of the extant genus Lepidobatrachus (Anura, Ceratophryidae) from the Late Miocene-Early Pliocene of central Argentina", Journal of Vertebrate Paleontology, 35 (5) e981636, Bibcode:2015JVPal..35E1636N, doi:10.1080/02724634.2015.981636, hdl:11336/46258

Monte León Formation

- Náñez, Carolina; Quattrocchio, Mirta E.; Ruiz, Liliana (2009), "Palinología y micropaleontología de las Formaciones San Julián y Monte León (Oligoceno - Mioceno temprano) en el subsuelo de cabo Curioso, provincia de Santa Cruz, Argentina", Ameghiniana, 46: 669–693

El Morterito Formation

- Morton, Lourdes S.; Herbst, Rafael (2007), "Gastrópodos de la Formación El Morterito (Mioceno Superior), Valle del Cajón, provincia de Catamarca, Argentina", Revista del Museo Argentino de Ciencias Naturales, 9: 153–160, doi:10.22179/REVMACN.9.305

Palo Pintado Formation

- Anzótegui, Luisa M.; Horn, Maricel Yarina (2011), "Megaflora de la Formación Palo Pintado (Mioceno Superior) Salta, Argentina Parte II" (PDF), Revista Brasileira de Paleontologia, 14 (3): 239–254, Bibcode:2011RvBrP..14..239A, doi:10.4072/rbp.2011.3.04
- Galli, Claudia Inés; Anzótegui, Luisa Matilde; Horn, Maricel Yanina; Morton, Lourdes Susana (2011), "Paleoambiente y paleocomunidades de la Formación Palo Pintado (Mioceno-Plioceno), Provincia de Salta, Argentina" (PDF), Revista Mexicana de Ciencias Geológicas, 28: 161–174
- Reguero, Marcelo A.; Candela, Adriana M.; Galli, Claudia I.; Bonini, Ricardo; Voglino, Damián (2015), "A new Hypsodont Notoungulate (Hegetotheriidae, Pachyrukhinae) from the late Miocene of the Eastern Cordillera, Salta province, Northwest of Argentina" (PDF), Andean Geology, 42: 56–70, doi:10.5027/andgeoV42n1-a04

Paraná Formation

- Brea, Mariana; Franco, María Jimena; Zucol, Alejandro F. (2013), "Paleoflora de la Formación Paraná (Mioceno Tardío), Cuenca Chaco-Paranaense, Argentina" (PDF), El Neógeno de la Mesopotamia argentina, Asociación Paleontológica Argentina, Publicación Especial, 14: 41–55
- Cione, Alberto Luis; Cabrera, Daniel Alfredo; Barla, María Julia (2012), "Oldest record of the Great White Shark (Lamnidae, Carcharodon; Miocene) in the Southern Atlantic" (PDF), Geobios, 45 (2): 167–172, Bibcode:2012Geobi..45..167C, doi:10.1016/j.geobios.2011.06.002, hdl:11336/139163
- Martín Pérez, Leandro (2013), Sistemática, tafonomía y paleoecología de los invertebrados de la Formación Paraná (Mioceno), Provincia de Entre Ríos, Argentina (PhD thesis) (PDF), Universidad Nacional de La Plata, pp. 1–398

Peñas Coloradas Formation

- Clyde, William C.; Wilf, Peter; Iglesias, Ari; Slingerland, Rudy L.; Bijl, Peter K.; Bralower, Timothy J.; Brinkhuis, Henk; Comer, Emily; Huber, Mauricio Ibañez Mejia, Brian R. Jicha, J. Marcelo Krause, Jonathan D. Schueth, Bradley S. Singer, María Sol Raigemborn, Mark D. Schmitz, Appy Sluijs, and María del Carmen Zamaloa, Brian T. (2014), "New age constraints for the Salamanca Formation and lower Río Chico Group in the western San Jorge Basin, Patagonia, Argentina: Implications for Cretaceous-Paleogene extinction recovery and land mammal age correlations" (PDF), GSA Bulletin, 126 (3–4): 289–306, Bibcode:2014GSAB..126..289C, doi:10.1130/B30915.1
- Raigemborn, María Sol; Krause, Javier M.; Bellosi, Eduardo; Matheos, Sergio D. (2010), "Redefinición estratigráfica del Grupo Río Chico (Paleógeno inferior), en el norte de la Cuenca del Golfo San Jorge, Chubut" (PDF), Revista de la Asociación Geológica Argentina, 67: 239–256

Pinturas Formation

- Kramarz, Alejandro G.; Bond, Mariano (2005), "Los Litopterna (Mammalia) de la Formación Pinturas, Mioceno Temprano-Medio de Patagonia", Ameghiniana, 42: 611–625
- Kramarz, Alejandro G (2001), Estudio de la fauna de roedores de la Formación Pinturas, Mioceno medio inferior de la Provincia de Santa Cruz (PhD thesis) (PDF), Universidad de Buenos Aires, pp. 1–300

Piquete Formation

- González Bonorino, Gustavo; Abascal, Liliana del Valle (2012), "Orogénesis y drenaje en la región del Valle de Lerma (Cordillera Oriental, Salta, Argentina) durante Pleistoceno tardio" (PDF), Revista de la Asociación Geológica Argentina, 69: 127–141

Playa de Los Lobos Allo Formation

- Degrange, Federico J.; Tambussi, Claudia P.; Taglioretti, Matías L.; Dondas, Alejandro; Scaglia, Fernando (2015), "A new Mesembriornithinae (Aves, Phorusrhacidae) provides new insights into the phylogeny and sensory capabilities of terror birds", Journal of Vertebrate Paleontology, 35 (2) e912656, Bibcode:2015JVPal..35E2656D, doi:10.1080/02724634.2014.912656, hdl:11336/38650

Puerta del Diablo Formation

- Cione, Alberto Luis; Casciotta, Jorge Rafael; Azpelicueta, María de las Mercedes; Barla, María Julia; Cozzuol, Mario Alberto (2005), "Peces marinos y continentales del Mioceno del área mesopotámica argentina. Edad y relaciones biogeográficas" (PDF), Insugeo, 14: 49–64

Puerto Madryn Formation

- Acosta Hospitaleche, C.; Tambussi, C.; Donato, M.; Cozzuol, M. (2007), "A new Miocene penguin from Patagonia and its phylogenetic relationships" (PDF), Acta Palaeontologica Polonica, 52: 299–314
- Acosta Hospitaleche, Carolina (2003), "Paraptenodytes antarcticus (Aves: Sphenisciformes) en la Formación Puerto Madryn (Mioceno Tardío temprano), provincia de Chubut, Argentina [Paraptenodytes antarcticus (Aves: Sphenisciformes) in the Puerto Madryn Formation (early Late Mioceno), Chubut Province, Argentina]" (PDF), Española de Paleontología, 18: 179–183

Quebrada de Los Colorados Formation

- Chornogubsky, Laura; Zimicz, A. Natalia; Goin, Francisco J.; Fernicola, Juan C.; Payrola, Patricio; Cárdenas, Magalí (2019), "New Palaeogene metatherians from the Quebrada de Los Colorados Formation at Los Cardones National Park (Salta Province, Argentina)", Journal of Systematic Palaeontology, 17 (7): 539–555, Bibcode:2019JSPal..17..539C, doi:10.1080/14772019.2017.1417333, hdl:11336/91661
- García López, Daniel A.; Deraco, Virginia; Del Papa, Cecilia (2017), "Fossil mammals of the Quebrada de los Colorados Formation (late middle Eocene) at the locality of La Poma, Salta Province, Argentina", Historical Biology: An International Journal of Paleobiology, 30 (4): 507–517, Bibcode:2018HBio...30..507G, doi:10.1080/08912963.2017.1299150, hdl:11336/63085
- Del Papa, Cecilia (2013), "Relaciones estratigráficas de las formaciones Quebrada de Los Colorados y Angastaco (Paleógeno-Neógeno), Valles Calchaquíes, Salta (Argentina): Significado en el análisis de la cuenca del Grupo Payogastilla" (PDF), Latin American Journal of Sedimentology and Basin Analysis, 20: 51–64
- Payrola Bosio, Patricio Augusto; del Papa, Cecilia; Hongn, Fernando; Powell, Jaime (2010), "Estratigrafía del Valle de Luracatao (Valle Calchaquí, Noroeste Argentino): Nueva propuesta" (PDF), Revista de la Asociación Geológica Argentina, 67: 309–318

Río Chico Group

- Raigemborn, María Sol; Krause, Javier M.; Bellosi, Eduardo; Matheos, Sergio D. (2010), "Redefinición estratigráfica del Grupo Río Chico (Paleógeno inferior), en el norte de la Cuenca del Golfo San Jorge, Chubut" (PDF), Revista de la Asociación Geológica Argentina, 67: 239–256

Río Foyel Formation

- Acosta Hospitaleche, Carolina; Griffin, Miguel; Asensio, Marcos; Cione, Alberto Luis; Tambussi, Claudia (2013), "Middle Cenozoic penguin remains from the Patagonian Cordillera" (PDF), Andean Geology, 40: 490–503
- Encinas, Alfonso; Folguera, Andrés; Bechis, Florencia; Finger, Kenneth L.; Zambrano, Patricio; Pérez, Felipe; Bernabé, Pablo; Tapia, Francisca; Riffo, Ricardo; Buatois, Luis; Orts, Darío; Nielsen, Sven N.; Valencia, Victor V.; Cuitiño, José; Oliveros, Verónica; De Girolamo Del Mauro, Lizet; Ramos, Victor A. (2018). "The Late Oligocene–Early Miocene Marine Transgression of Patagonia". The Evolution of the Chilean-Argentinean Andes. Cham: Springer International Publishing. pp. 443–474. doi:10.1007/978-3-319-67774-3_18. ISBN 978-3-319-67773-6.

Río Loro Formation

- Pol, Diego; Powell, Jaime E. (2011), "A new sebecid mesoeucrocodylian from the Rio Loro Formation (Palaeocene) of north-western Argentina", Zoological Journal of the Linnean Society, 163: S7–S36, doi:10.1111/j.1096-3642.2011.00714.x, hdl:11336/69518

Río Mayo Formation

- Escosteguy, Leonardo; Dal Molín, Carlos; Franchi, Mario; Guena, Silvena; Lapido, Omar; Genini, Adolfo (2003), Hoja Geológica 4772-II Lago Buenos Aires, Instituto de Geología y Recursos Minerales, Servicio Geológico Minero Argentino, pp. 1–80

Río Negro Formation

- Pérez, Mariano (2012), Análisis paleoambiental del miembro superior de la Formación Río Negro (Mioceno-Plioceno de Patagonia septentrional): un ejemplo de interacción fluvio-eólica compleja (BSc. thesis) (PDF), Universidad Nacional de La Pampa, pp. 1–47

Río Quinto Formation

- Cerdeño, Esperanza; Chiesa, Jorge; Ojeda, Guillermo (2008), "Presence of Oxyodontherium (Macraucheniidae, Litopterna)in the Río Quinto Formation, San Luis (Argentina)", Journal of South American Earth Sciences, 25 (2): 217–226, Bibcode:2008JSAES..25..217C, doi:10.1016/j.jsames.2007.06.004

Saladillo Formation

- Brambilla, Luciano; Ibarra, Damián Alberto (2017), "A new species of Eutatus Gervais (Xenarthra, Dasypodidae) from the Late Pleistocene of the Northern Pampean Region, Argentina", Palaeontologia Electronica, 20 (1): Article number 20.1.13A

Salamanca Formation

- Apesteguia, Sebastián; Gómez, Raúl O.; Rougier, Guillermo W. (2014), "The youngest South American rhynchocephalian, a survivor of the K/Pg extinction", Proceedings of the Royal Society B: Biological Sciences, 281 (1792) 20140811, Bibcode:2014PBioS.28140811A, doi:10.1098/rspb.2014.0811, PMC 4150314, PMID 25143041
- Bonaparte, J.F.; Morales, J. (1997), "Un primitico Notonychopidae (Litopterna) del paleoceno inferior de Punta Peligro, Chubut, Argentina" (PDF), Estudios Geológicos, 53 (5–6): 263–274, Bibcode:1997EstGM..53..263B, doi:10.3989/egeol.97535-6232
- Clyde, William C.; Wilf, Peter; Iglesias, Ari; Slingerland, Rudy L.; Barnum, Timothy; Bijl, Peter K.; Bralower, Timothy J.; Brinkhuis, Henk; Comer, Brian T. Huber, Mauricio Ibañez Mejia, Brian R. Jicha, J. Marcelo Krause, Jonathan D. Schueth, Bradley S. Singer, María Sol Raigemborn, Mark D. Schmitz, Appy Sluijs, María del Carmen Zamaloa, Emily E. (2014), "New age constraints for the Salamanca Formation and lower Río Chico Group in the western San Jorge Basin, Patagonia, Argentina: Implications for Cretaceous-Paleogene extinction recovery and land mammal age correlations" (PDF), GSA Bulletin, 126 (3–4): 289–306, Bibcode:2014GSAB..126..289C, doi:10.1130/B30915.1
- Jud, Nathan A.; Gandolfo, Maria A.; Iglesias, Ari; Wilf, Peter (2017), "Flowering after disaster: Early Danian buckthorn (Rhamnaceae) flowers and leaves from Patagonia", PLOS ONE, 12 (5) e0176164, Bibcode:2017PLoSO..1276164J, doi:10.1371/journal.pone.0176164, PMC 5425202, PMID 28489895
- Ruiz, Daniela P.; Brea, Mariana; Raigemborn, M. Sol; Matheos, Sergio D. (2017), "Conifer woods from the Salamanca Formation (early Paleocene), Central Patagonia, Argentina: Paleoenvironmental implications", Journal of South American Earth Sciences, 76: 427–445, Bibcode:2017JSAES..76..427R, doi:10.1016/j.jsames.2017.04.006, hdl:11336/41178

Saldungaray Formation

- Verzi, Diego H.; Montalvo, Claudia I.; Deschamps, Cecilia M. (2008), "Biostratigraphy and biochronology of the Late Miocene of central Argentina: Evidence from rodents and taphonomy", Geobios, 41 (1): 145–155, Bibcode:2008Geobi..41..145V, doi:10.1016/j.geobios.2006.09.005

Salicas Formation

- Brandoni, Diego; Schmidt, Gabriela I.; Candela, Adriana M.; Noriega, Jorge I.; Brunetto, Ernesto; Fiorelli, Lucas E. (2012), "Mammals from the Salicas Formation (Late Miocene), La Rioja Province, Northwestern Argentina: Paleobiogeography, age and paleoenvironment" (PDF), Ameghiniana, 49 (3): 1–13, Bibcode:2012Amegh..49..375B, doi:10.5710/AMGH.v49i3(467)

Santa Cruz Formation

- Agnolin, Federico L (2009), Sistemática y Filogenia de las Aves Fororracoideas (Gruiformes, Cariamae) (PDF), Fundación de Historia Natural Felix de Azara, pp. 1–79
- Arnal, M.; Vucetich, M.G. (2015), "Revision of the fossil rodent Acaremys Ameghino, 1887 (Hystricognathi, Octodontoidea, Acaremyidae) from the Miocene of Patagonia (Argentina) and the description of a new acaremyid", Historical Biology: An International Journal of Paleobiology, 27 (1): 42–59, Bibcode:2015HBio...27...42A, doi:10.1080/08912963.2013.863881, hdl:11336/13646
- Bostelmann, J. Enrique; Le Roux, Jacobus P.; Vásquez, Ana; Gutiérrez, Néstor M.; Oyarzún, José Luis; Carreño, Catalina; Torres, Teresa; Otero, Rodrigo; Llanos, C. Mark Fanning, Francisco Hervé, Andrea (2013), "Burdigalian deposits of the Santa Cruz Formation in the Sierra Baguales, Austral (Magallanes) Basin: Age, depositional environment and vertebrate fossils" (PDF), Andean Geology, 40: 458–489
- Brea, Mariana; Zucol, Alejandro F.; Bargo, M. Susana; Fernicola, Juan Carlos; Vizcaíno, Sergio F. (2017), "First Miocene record of Akaniaceae in Patagonia (Argentina): a fossil wood from the early Miocene Santa Cruz formation and its palaeobiogeographical implications", Botanical Journal of the Linnean Society, 183 (3): 334–347, doi:10.1093/botlinnean/bow014, hdl:11336/65078
- Buffetaut, Éric (2016), "A reassessment of the giant birds Liornis floweri Ameghino, 1895 and Callornis giganteus Ameghino, 1895, from the Santacrucian (late Early Miocene) of Argentina", Palæovertebrata, 40 (2) e3, doi:10.18563/pv.40.2.e3
- Cenizo, Marcos Martín; Agnolín, Federico Lisandro (2010), "The southernmost records of Anhingidae and a new basal species of Anatidae (Aves) from the lower–middle Miocene of Patagonia, Argentina", Alcheringa: An Australasian Journal of Palaeontology, 34 (4): 493–514, Bibcode:2010Alch...34..493C, doi:10.1080/03115511003793504
- Chandler, Robert M (2012), "A new species of tinamou (Aves: Tinamiformes, Tinamidae) from the Early-Middle Miocene of Argentina" (PDF), PalArch's Journal of Vertebrate Palaeontology, 9 (2): 1–8
- Ercoli, Marcos D.; Prevosti, Francisco J. (2011), "Estimación de masa de las especies de Sparassodonta (Mammalia, Metatheria) de edad Santacrucense (Mioceno Temprano) a partir del tamaño del centroide de los elementos apendiculares: inferencias paleoecológicas", Ameghiniana, 48 (4): 462–479, Bibcode:2011Amegh..48..462E, doi:10.5710/AMGH.v48i4(347)
- González, Laureano Raúl; Scillato Yané, Gustavo Juan (2008), "Una nueva especie de Stegotherium Ameghino (Xenarthra, Dasypodidae, Stegotheriini) del Mioceno de la provincia de Santa Cruz (Argentina)", Ameghiniana, 45: 641–648
- Mayr, Gerald; Noriega, Jorge I. (2015), "A well-preserved partial skeleton of the poorly known early Miocene seriema Noriegavis santacrucensis" (PDF), Acta Palaeontologica Polonica, 60 (3): 589–598, Bibcode:2015AcPaP..60..589M, doi:10.4202/app.00011.2013
- Muñoz, Nahuel A.; Toledo, Néstor; Candela, Adriana M.; Vizcaíno, Sergio F. (2019), "Functional morphology of the forelimb of Early Miocene caviomorph rodents from Patagonia", Lethaia, 52 (1): 91–106, Bibcode:2019Letha..52...91M, doi:10.1111/let.12292
- Noriega, Jorge I.; Mayr, Gerald (2017), "The systematic affinities of the putative seriema Noriegavis santacrucensis (Noriega et al., 2009) from the Miocene of Argentina", Contribuciones del Museo Argentino de Ciencias Naturales, 7: 133–139
- Noriega, Jorge I.; Vizcaíno, Sergio F.; Bargo, Susana (2009), "First Record and a New Species of Seriema (Aves: Ralliformes: Cariamidae) from Santacrucian (Early-Middle Miocene) Beds of Patagonia", Journal of Vertebrate Paleontology, 29 (2): 620–626, Bibcode:2009JVPal..29..620N, doi:10.1671/039.029.0216, hdl:11336/80002
- Sinclair, W.; Farr, M. (1932), "Aves of the Santa Cruz beds", Reports of the Princeton University Expeditions to Patagonia (1896–1899), 7: 157–191
- Verzi, Diego H.; Olivares, A. Itatí; Morgan, Cecilia C. (2017), "Systematics and evolutionary significance of the small Abrocomidae from the early Miocene of southern South America", Historical Biology: An International Journal of Paleobiology, 29 (3): 411–422, Bibcode:2017HBio...29..411V, doi:10.1080/08912963.2016.1168410, hdl:11336/56470
- Vizcaíno, Sergio F.; Kay, Richard F.; Bargo, Susana (2012), Early Miocene Paleobiology in Patagonia: High-Latitude Paleocommunities of the Santa Cruz Formation, Cambridge University Press, pp. 1–370, ISBN 978-0-521-19461-7

Sarmiento Formation & Colhué Huapí Member

- Acosta Hospitaleche, Carolina; Tambussi, Claudia (2005), "Phorusrhacidae Psilopterinae (Aves) en la Formación Sarmiento de la localidad de Gran Hondonada (Eoceno Superior), Patagonia, Argentina [Phorusrhacidae Psilopterinae (Birds) in the Sarmiento Formation from the Gran Hondonada locality (Upper Eocene), Patagonia, Argentina]" (PDF), Revista Española de Paleontología, 20: 127–132
- Arnal, Michelle; Kramarz, Alejandro G.; Vucetich, M. Guiomar; Vieytes, E. Carolina (2014), "A new early Miocene octodontoid rodent (Hystricognathi, Caviomorpha) from Patagonia (Argentina) and a reassessment of the early evolution of Octodontoidea", Journal of Vertebrate Paleontology, 34 (2): 397–406, Bibcode:2014JVPal..34..397A, doi:10.1080/02724634.2013.808203, hdl:11336/29748
- Cheme Arriaga, Lucas; Dozo, María Teresa; Gelfo, Javier N. (2016), "A new Cramaucheniinae (Litopterna, Macraucheniidae) from the early Miocene of Patagonia, Argentina", Journal of Vertebrate Paleontology, 36 (6) e1229672, Bibcode:2016JVPal..36E9672C, doi:10.1080/02724634.2017.1229672, hdl:11336/30386
- Dozo, María Teresa; Ciancio, Martín; Bouza, Pablo; Martínez, Gastón (2014), "Nueva asociación de mamíferos del Paleógeno en el este de la Patagonia (provincia de Chubut, Argentina): implicancias biocronológicas y paleobiogeográficas" (PDF), Andean Geology, 41: 224–247, Bibcode:2014AndGe..41a...9D, doi:10.5027/andgeoV41n1-a09
- Pérez, María Encarnación; Krause, Marcelo; Vucetich, María Guiomar (2012), "A new species of Chubutomys (Rodentia, Hystricognathi) from the late Oligocene of Patagonia and its implications on the early evolutionary history of Cavioidea sensu stricto", Geobios, 45 (6): 573–580, Bibcode:2012Geobi..45..573P, doi:10.1016/j.geobios.2012.06.001
- Shockey, Bruce J.; Flynn, John J.; Croft, Darin A.; Gans, Phillip; Wyss, André R. (2012), "New leontiniid Notoungulata (Mammalia) from Chile and Argentina: comparative anatomy, character analysis, and phylogenetic hypotheses", American Museum Novitates (3737): 1–64, doi:10.1206/3737.2, hdl:2246/6161
- Sterli, Juliana; De la Fuente, Marcelo S.; Krause, J. Marcelo (2015), "A new turtle from the Palaeogene of Patagonia (Argentina) sheds new light on the diversity and evolution of the bizarre clade of horned turtles (Meiolaniidae, Testudinata)", Zoological Journal of the Linnean Society, 174 (3): 519–548, doi:10.1111/zoj.12252, hdl:11336/41594
- Vucetich, M.G.; Dozo, M.T.; Arnal, M.; Pérez, M.E. (2015), "New rodents (Mammalia) from the late Oligocene of Cabeza Blanca (Chubut) and the first rodent radiation in Patagonia", Historical Biology: An International Journal of Paleobiology, 27 (2): 236–257, Bibcode:2015HBio...27..236V, doi:10.1080/08912963.2014.883506, hdl:11336/17958
- Vucetich, María G.; Pérez, María E.; Ciancio, Martín R.; Carlini, Alfredo A.; Madden, Richard H.; Kohn, Matthew J. (2014), "A new acaremyid rodent (Caviomorpha, Octodontoidea) from Scarritt Pocket, Deseadan (late Oligocene) of Patagonia (Argentina)", Journal of Vertebrate Paleontology, 34 (3): 689–698, Bibcode:2014JVPal..34..689V, doi:10.1080/02724634.2013.804414, hdl:11336/17973
- Wyss, André R.; Flynn, John J.; Croft, Darin A. (2018), "New Paleogene notohippids and leontiniids (Toxodontia; Notoungulata; Mammalia) from the Early Oligocene Tinguiririca Fauna of the Andean Main Range, central Chile", Journal of South American Earth Sciences, 3903: 1–42, hdl:2246/6901

Toro Negro Formation

- Ciccioli, Patricia L (2017), "Estudios de procedencia de la Formación Toro Negro a partir de modas detríticas y edades U-Pb en circones detríticos: implicancias para la evolución del Antepaís Fracturado Andino (La Rioja)" (PDF), Anales de la Academia Nacional de Ciencias Exactas, Físicas y Naturales, 69: 68–82

Uquía Formation

- Daza, J.D.; Abdala, V.; Arias, J.S.; García López, D.; Ortiz, P. (2012), "Cladistic Analysis of Iguania and a Fossil Lizard from the Late Pliocene of Northwestern Argentina", Journal of Herpetology, 46 (1): 104–119, Bibcode:2012JHerp..46..104D, doi:10.1670/10-112, hdl:11336/61054
- Ortiz, Pablo E.; Jayat, J. Pablo; Steppan, Scott J. (2012), "A New fossil phyllotine (Rodentia, Sigmodontinae) from the late Pliocene in the Andes of northern Argentina" (PDF), Journal of Vertebrate Paleontology, 32 (6): 1429–1441, Bibcode:2012JVPal..32.1429O, doi:10.1080/02724634.2012.707998, hdl:11336/10594
- Reguero, Marcelo A.; Candela, Adriana M. (2008), Bioestratigrafía de las secuencias neógenas tardías de la Quebrada de Humahuaca, Provincia de Jujuy. Implicancias paleoambientales y paleobiogeográficas, Relatorio del XVII Congreso Geológico Argentino, pp. 286–296

Vaca Mahuida Formation

- Montalvo, C.; Bond, M. (1998), "Un notoungulata de la Formación Vaca Mahuida (Eoceno), provincia de La Pampa, Argentina", Asociación Paleontológica Argentina, Publicación Especial, 5: 55–60

Ventana Formation

- Petrulevicius, J.F.; Popov, Y.A. (2014), "First fossil record of Discocephalinae (Insecta, Pentatomidae): a new genus from the middle Eocene of Río Pichileufú, Patagonia, Argentina", ZooKeys (422): 23–3, Bibcode:2014ZooK..422...23P, doi:10.3897/zookeys.422.6750, PMC 4109444, PMID 25061387
- Wilf, P.; Johnson, K.R.; Cúneo, N.R.; Smith, M.E.; Singer, B.S.; Gandolfo, M.A. (2005), "Eocene Plant Diversity at Laguna del Hunco and Río Pichileufú, Patagonia, Argentina", The American Naturalist, 165 (6): 634–650, Bibcode:2005ANat..165..634W, doi:10.1086/430055, PMID 15937744

Vorohué Formation

- Olivares, A.I.; Verzi, D.H. (2015), "Systematics, phylogeny and evolutionary pattern of the hystricognath rodent Eumysops (Echimyidae) from the Plio–Pleistocene of southern South America", Historical Biology: An International Journal of Paleobiology, 27 (8): 1042–1061, Bibcode:2015HBio...27.1042O, doi:10.1080/08912963.2014.929672, hdl:11336/53846
- Orgeira, María Julia (1988), Estudio geológico y paleomagnético de los sedimentos asignados al cenozoico tardío aflorantes costeros entre Mar del Plata y Miramar (Provincia de Buenos Aires) (PhD thesis) (PDF), Universidad de Buenos Aires, pp. 1–170
- Tonni, Eduardo P.; Noriega, Jorge I. (1996), "Una nueva especie de Nandayus Bonaparte, 1854 (Aves: Psittaciformes) del Pliocene tardío de Argentina" (PDF), Revista Chilena de Historia Natural, 69: 97–104

Yupoí Formation

- Erra, Georgina; Osterrieth, Margarita; Zurita, Alfredo E.; Lutz, Alicia I.; Laffont, Enrique; Coronel, Juan M.; Francia, Analia (2016), "Primer registro de termiteros fósiles para el Pleistoceno tardío de la región mesopotámica (Argentina): implicancias paleoambientales" (PDF), Acta Biológica Colombiana, 21: 63–72

==== Bolivia ====
- Marshall, Larry G.; Sempere, Thierry (1991), "The Eocene to Pleistocene vertebrates of Bolivia and their stratigraphic context: A review", Revista técnica de YPFB, 12: 631–652
- Renner, Sven; Velasco, Carlos (2000), Geología e hidrogeología del Valle Central de Cochabamba - Geology and hydrogeology of the Central Valley of Cochabamba (PDF), Convenio alemán-boliviano de aguas subterraneas (CABAS) - German-Bolivian Agreement on Groundwater (CABAS), pp. 1–113
- Rocha, Emilio (2013), Estilos estructurales del Subandino Sur de Bolivia (PhD thesis) (PDF), Universidad de Buenos Aires, pp. 1–204

Casira Formation

- Cerdeño, Esperanza; Vera, Bárbara; Schmidt, Gabriela Inés; Pujos, François; Mamaní Quispe, Bernardino (2012), "An almost complete skeleton of a new Mesotheriidae (Notoungulata) from the Late Miocene of Casira, Bolivia", Journal of Systematic Palaeontology, 10 (2): 341–360, Bibcode:2012JSPal..10..341C, doi:10.1080/14772019.2011.569576, hdl:11336/60297

Cerdas beds

- Croft, Darin A.; Carlini, Alfredo A.; Ciancio, Martín R.; Brandoni, Diego; Drew, Nicholas E.; Engelman, Russell K.; Anaya, Federico (2016), "New mammal faunal data from Cerdas, Bolivia, a middle-latitude Neotropical site that chronicles the end of the Middle Miocene Climatic Optimum in South America", Journal of Vertebrate Paleontology, 36 (5) e1163574, Bibcode:2016JVPal..36E3574C, doi:10.1080/02724634.2016.1163574, hdl:11336/49745

Honda Group

- Croft, Darin A (2007), "The Middle Miocene (Laventan) Quebrada Honda Fauna, southern Bolivia and a description of its Notoungulates", Palaeontology, 50 (1): 277–303, Bibcode:2007Palgy..50..277C, doi:10.1111/j.1475-4983.2006.00610.x
- Engelman, Russell K.; Anaya, Federico; Croft, Darin A. (2018), "Australogale leptognathus, gen. et sp. nov., a second species of small sparassodont (Mammalia: Metatheria) from the middle Miocene locality of Quebrada Honda, Bolivia", Journal of Mammalian Evolution, in press: _
- Engelman, Russell K.; Anaya, Federico; Croft, Darin A. (2016), "New palaeothentid marsupials (Paucituberculata) from the middle Miocene of Quebrada Honda, Bolivia, and their implications for the palaeoecology, decline and extinction of the Palaeothentoidea", Journal of Systematic Palaeontology, 15 (10): 787–820, doi:10.1080/14772019.2016.1240112
- Pujos, François; De Iuliis, Gerardo; Mamani Quispe, Bernardino; Andrade Flores, Ruben (2014), "Lakukullus anatisrostratus, gen. et sp. nov., a new massive nothrotheriid sloth (Xenarthra, Pilosa) from the middle Miocene of Bolivia", Journal of Vertebrate Paleontology, 34 (5): 1243–1248, Bibcode:2014JVPal..34.1243P, doi:10.1080/02724634.2014.849716, hdl:11336/32146

Lacayani fauna

- Billet, Guillaume; De Muizon, Christian; Mamani Quispe, Bernardino (2008), "Late Oligocene mesotheriids (Mammalia, Notoungulata) from Salla and Lacayani (Bolivia): implications for basal mesotheriid phylogeny and distribution", Zoological Journal of the Linnean Society, 152: 153–200, doi:10.1111/j.1096-3642.2007.00388.x

Ñuapua Formation

- Pardiñas, Ulyses F.J.; Galliari, Carlos A. (1998), "Sigmodontinos (Rodentia, Muridae) del Holoceno inferior de Bolivia" (PDF), Revista Española de Paleontología, 13: 17–25

Quehua Formation

- Baldellón P., Eddy; Fornari, Michel; Espinoza R., Félix; Soler, Pierre (1994), Sucesión Estructural de la Zona Serranía de las Minas (PDF), Memorias del XI Congreso Geológico de Bolivia, pp. 238–247

Salla Formation

- Reguero, Marcelo A.; Cerdeño, Esperanza (2005), "New late Oligocene Hegetotheriidae (Mammalia, Notoungulata) from Salla, Bolivia", Journal of Vertebrate Paleontology, 25 (3): 674–684, doi:10.1671/0272-4634(2005)025[0674:NLOHMN]2.0.CO;2
- Rincón, Ascanio D.; Shockey, Bruce J.; Anaya, Federico; Solórzano, Andrés (2015), "Palaeothentid Marsupials of the Salla Beds of Bolivia (Late Oligocene): Two New Species and Insights into the Post-Eocene Radiation of Palaeothentoids", Journal of Mammalian Evolution, 22 (4): 455–471, doi:10.1007/s10914-015-9295-8
- Shockey, Bruce J (2017), "New early diverging cingulate (Xenarthra: Peltephilidae) from the Late Oligocene of Bolivia and considerations regarding the origin of crown Xenarthra", Bulletin of the Peabody Museum of Natural History, 58 (2): 371–396

Santa Lucía Formation

- Buffetaut, É.; Marshall, L.G. (1991), A new crocodilian, Sebecus querejazus, nov. sp. (Mesosuchia, Sebecidae) from the Santa Lucía Formation (Early Paleocene) at Vila Vila, Southern Bolivia, Revista Técnica de YPFB, pp. 545–557
- Gaffney, Eugene S.; Meylan, Peter A.; Wood, Roger C.; Simons, Elwyn; De Almeida Campos, Diogenes (2011), "Evolution of the side-necked turtles: the family Podocnemididae" (PDF), AMNH Bulletin, 350: 1–237
- Gayet, Mireille; Marshall, Larry G.; Sempere, Thierry (1991), "The Mesozoic and Paleocene vertebrates of Bolivia and their stratigraphic context: a review", Revista técnica de YPFB, 12: 393–433
- Jiménez, Grisel (2012), Estratigrafía, facies y ambientes evolutivos de depósito del Paleógeno Inferior: Formación Santa Lucía (Sinclinal de Miraflores - Sección Cayara, Potosí) (PDF), ., pp. 1–23
- De Muizon, Christian; Ladevèze, Sandrine; Selva, Charlène; Vignaud, Robin; Goussard, Florent (2018), "Allqokirus australis (Sparassodonta, Metatheria) from the early Palaeocene of Tiupampa (Bolivia) and the rise of the metatherian carnivorous radiation in South America", Geodiversitas, 40 (16): 363–459, Bibcode:2018Geodv..40..363M, doi:10.5252/geodiversitas2018v40a16
- Rage, J.C. (1991), "Gymnophionan Amphibia from the early Paleocene (Santa Lucía Formation) of Tiupampa (Bolivia). The oldest known Gymnophiona", Revista técnica de YPFB, 12: 499–501
- Rage, J.C. (1991), "Squamate Reptiles from the early Paleocene of Tiupampa area (Santa Lucía Formation), Bolivia", Revista técnica de YPFB, 12: 503–508
- Renner, Sven; Velasco, Carlos (2000), "Geología e hidrogeología del Valle Central de Cochabamba" (PDF), Boletín del Servicio Nacional de Geología y Minería, 34: 1–113
- Sempere, Thierry; Butler, R.F.; Richards, D.R.; Marshall, L.G.; Sharp, W.; Swisher, C.C. (1997), "Stratigraphy and chronology of Upper Cretaceous-lower Paleogene strata in Bolivia and northwest Argentina" (PDF), GSA Bulletin, 109 (6): 709–727, Bibcode:1997GSAB..109..709S, doi:10.1130/0016-7606(1997)109<0709:SACOUC>2.3.CO;2

Tarija Formation

- Machado, Leonardo F.; Leite, Yuri L.R.; Christoff, Alexandre U.; Giugliano, Lilian G. (2014), "Phylogeny and biogeography of tetralophodont rodents of the tribe Oryzomyini (Cricetidae: Sigmodontinae)", Zoologica Scripta, 43 (2): 119–130, doi:10.1111/zsc.12041

Umala Formation

- Pujos, François; De Iuliis, Gerardo; Mamani Quispe, Bernardino; Adnet, Sylvain; Flores, Ruben Andrade; Billet, Guillaume; Fernández Monescillo, Marcos; Marivaux, Laurent; Münch, Philippe, Mercedes B. Prámparo and Pierre-Olivier Antoine (2016), "A new nothrotheriid xenarthran from the early Pliocene of Pomata-Ayte (Bolivia): new insights into the caniniform–molariform transition in sloths", Zoological Journal of the Linnean Society, 178 (3): 679–712, doi:10.1111/zoj.12429, hdl:11336/182949

Yecua & Petaca Formations

- Hernández, R.; Jordan, T.; Dalenz Farjat, A.; Echavarría, L.; Idelman, B.; Reynolds, J. (2002), Edades, distribución, controles tectónicos y eustáticos de las ingresiones marinas paranense y caribeana en el sur de Bolivia y Argentina (PDF), V Congreso Latinoamericano de Paleontología, pp. 1–27

==== Brazil ====
- Rêgo Henriques, Deise Dias; Gallo da Silva, Valéria; Barbosa de Carvalho, Luciana; Kugland de Azevedo, Sergio Alex, Coleçao de tipos e figurados (8/1997) (PDF), Universidade Federal do Rio de Janeiro, pp. 1–20

Entre-Corrégos Formation

- Pereira, Karoline Gonçalves (2015), Mirtáceas da formação Entre-Corrégos, paleógeno da bacia de Aiuruoca, Estado de Minas Gerais, Brasil (MSc. thesis) (PDF), Universidade Guarulhos, pp. 1–139

Fonseca Formation

- Mendes, Márcio; de Oliveira, Francisco Irineudo Bezerra; Limaverde, Saulo (2015), "Um novo gênero e duas novas espécies de Pergidae (Insecta: Hymenoptera) na Formação Fonseca (Bacia de Fonseca, Paleógeno) Minas Gerais, Brazil", Revista de Geologia, 28: 27–36

Graxaim Formation

- Buchmann, Francisco Sekiguchi de Carvalho; Caron, Felipe; Pereira Lopes, Renato; Ugri, André; Gonçalves de Lima, Leonardo (2009), Panorama geológico da planície costeira do Rio Grande do Sul, _, pp. 11–32

Guabirotuba Formation

- Sedor, Fernando A.; Oliveira, Édison V.; Silva, David D.; Fernandes, Luiz A.; Cunha, Renata F.; Ribeiro, Ana M.; Dias, Eliseu V. (2017), "A New South American Paleogene Land Mammal Fauna, Guabirotuba Formation (Southern Brazil)" (PDF), Journal of Mammalian Evolution, 24: 39–55, doi:10.1007/s10914-016-9364-7

Içá Formation

- Czaplewski, Nicholas J.; Campbell, Kenneth E. Jr. (2017), "Late Miocene Bats from the Jurua River, State of Acre, Brazil, with a Description of a New Genus of Thyropteridae (Chiroptera, Mammalia)" (PDF), Contributions in Science, 525: 55–60, doi:10.5962/p.318347

Itaboraí Formation

- Carneiro, Leonardo M.; Oliveira, Édison V.; Goin, Francisco J. (2018), "Austropediomys marshalli gen. et sp. nov., a new Pediomyoidea (Mammalia, Metatheria) from the Paleogene of Brazil: paleobiogeographic implications" (PDF), Revista Brasileira de Paleontologia, 21 (2): 120–131, Bibcode:2018RvBrP..21..120C, doi:10.4072/rbp.2018.2.03
- Carneiro, Leonardo M. (2018), "A new protodidelphid (Mammalia, Marsupialia, Didelphimorphia) from the Itaboraí Basin and its implications for the evolution of the Protodidelphidae" (PDF), Anais da Academia Brasileira de Ciências, 91 (Suppl. 2) e20180440, doi:10.1590/0001-3765201820180440, PMID 30365721
- Oliveira, Édison Vicente; Zimicz, Natalia; Goin, Francisco J. (2016), "Taxonomy, affinities, and paleobiology of the tiny metatherian mammal Minusculodelphis, from the early Eocene of South America", The Science of Nature, 103 (1–2): 1–6, Bibcode:2016SciNa.103....6O, doi:10.1007/s00114-015-1331-2, hdl:11336/47616, PMID 26743194
- De Oliveira, Édison Vicente; Goin, Francisco J. (2015), "A new species of Gaylordia Paula Couto (Mammalia, Metatheria) from Itaboraí, Brazil", Revista Brasileira de Paleontologia, 18 (1): 97–108, Bibcode:2015RvBrP..18...97O, doi:10.4072/rbp.2015.1.07, hdl:11336/53454
- Oliveira, Édison V.; Goin, Francisco J. (2011), "A reassessment of Bunodont Metatherians from the Paleogene of Itaboraí (Brazil): systematics and age of the Itaboraian SALMA" (PDF), Revista Brasileira de Paleontologia, 14 (2): 105–136, Bibcode:2011RvBrP..14..105O, doi:10.4072/rbp.2011.2.01
- Salvador, R.B.; Simone, L.R.L. (2013), "Taxonomic revision of the fossil pulmonate mollusks of Itaboraí Basin (Paleocene), Brazil" (PDF), Papéis Avulsos de Zoologia, 53 (2): 5–46

Maria Farinha Formation

- De Araújo Carvalho, Anny Rafaela; Ghilardi, Aline Marcele; Franca Barreto, Alcina Magnólia (2016), "A new side-neck turtle (Pelomedusoides: Bothremydidae) from the Early Paleocene (Danian) Maria Farinha Formation, Paraíba Basin, Brazil", Zootaxa, 4126: 491–513

Pirabas Formation

- De Araújo Távora, Vladimir; Rodrigues dos Santos, André Augusto; Neto Araújo, Raphael (2010), "Localidades fossilíferas da Formação Pirabas (Mioceno Inferior)" (PDF), Boletim do Museu Paraense Emílio Goeldi, 5 (2): 207–224, doi:10.46357/bcnaturais.v5i2.644

Rio Madeira Formation

- Góis, Flávio; Scillato Yané, Gustavo Juan; Carlini, Alfredo Armando; Ubilla, Martín (2012), "Una nueva especie de Holmesina Simpson (Xenarthra, Cingulata, Pampatheriidae) del Pleistoceno de Rondônia, sudoeste de la Amazonia, Brasil" (PDF), Revista Brasileira de Paleontologia, 15 (2): 211–227, Bibcode:2012RvBrP..15..211G, doi:10.4072/rbp.2012.2.09

Santa Vitória Formation

- Oliveira, Édison V.; Prevosti, Francisco Juan; Pereira, Jamil C. (2005), "Protocyon troglodytes (Lund) (Mammalia, Carnivora) in the Late Pleistocene of Rio Grande do Sul and their paleoecological significance" (PDF), Revista Brasileira de Paleontologia, 8: 215–220

Solimões Formation

- Bocquentin, Jean; Melo, Janira (2006), "Stupendemys souzai sp. nov. (Pleurodira, Podocnemididae) from the Miocene-Pliocene of the Solimões Formation, Brazil" (PDF), Revista Brasileira de Paleontologia, 9 (2): 187–192, Bibcode:2006RvBrP...9..187B, doi:10.4072/rbp.2006.2.02
- Carvalho, Patricia; Bocquentin, Jean; De Lapparent de Broin, France (2002), "Une nouvelle espèce de Podocnemis (Pleurodira, Podocnemididae) provenant du Néogène de la formation Solimões, Acre, Brésil", Geobios, 35 (6): 677–686, Bibcode:2002Geobi..35..677C, doi:10.1016/S0016-6995(02)00081-5
- Cozzuol, Mario Alberto (2006), "The Acre vertebrate fauna: Age, diversity, and geography", Journal of South American Earth Sciences, 21 (3): 185–203, Bibcode:2006JSAES..21..185C, doi:10.1016/j.jsames.2006.03.005
- Kerber, Leonardo; Bissaro Júnior, Marcos César; Negri, Francisco R.; De Souza Filho, Jonas Pereira; Guilherme, Edson; Schmaltz Hsiou, Annie (2017), "A new rodent (Caviomorpha: Dinomyidae) from the upper Miocene of southwestern Brazilian Amazonia" (PDF), Historical Biology: An International Journal of Paleobiology, 30 (7): 985–993, Bibcode:2018HBio...30..985K, doi:10.1080/08912963.2017.1327529
- Kerber, Leonardo; Negri, Francisco Ricardo; Ribeiro, Ana Maria; Vucetich, Maria Guiomar; De Souza Filho, Jonas Pereira (2016), "Late Miocene potamarchine rodents from southwestern Amazonia, Brazil—with description of new taxa" (PDF), Acta Palaeontologica Polonica, 61 (1): 191–203, Bibcode:2016AcPaP..61..191K, doi:10.4202/app.00091.2014

Touro Passo Formation

- Kerber, Leonardo; Gregis Pitana, Vanessa; Ribeiro, Ana Maria; Schmaltz Hsiou, Annie; Oliveira, Edison V. (2014), "Late Pleistocene vertebrates from Touro Passo Creek (Touro Passo Formation), southern Brazil: a review" (PDF), Revista Mexicana de Ciencias Geológicas, 31: 248–259

Tremembé Formation

- Do Couto Ribeiro, Graziella (2010), Avaliação morfológica, taxonômica e cronológica dos mamíferos fósseis da Formação Tremembé (Bacia de Taubaté), Estado de São Paulo, Brasil, Universidade de São Paulo, pp. 1–112
- Malabarba, Maria Claudia; Lundberg, John G. (2007), "A fossil loricariid catfish (Siluriformes: Loricarioidea) from the Taubaté Basin, eastern Brazil", Neotropical Ichthyology, 5 (3): 263–270, doi:10.1590/S1679-62252007000300005
- Olson, Storrs L.; Alvarenga, Herculano M.F. (2002), "A new genus of small teratorn from the Middle Tertiary of the Taubate Basin, Brazil (Aves: Teratornithidae)" (PDF), Proceedings of the Biological Society of Washington, 115: 701–705

==== Chile ====
Abanico Formation

- Bertrand, Ornella C.; Flynn, John J.; Croft, Darin A.; Wyss, André R. (2012), "Two new taxa (Caviomorpha, Rodentia) from the early Oligocene Tinguiririca fauna (Chile)", American Museum Novitates (3750): 1–36, doi:10.1206/3750.2
- Bradham, Jennifer; Flynn, John J.; Croft, Darin A.; Wyss, Andre R. (2015), "New notoungulates (Notostylopidae and basal toxodontians) from the early Oligocene Tinguiririca fauna of the Andean Main Range, central Chile", American Museum Novitates (3841): 1–24, doi:10.1206/3841.1, hdl:2246/6621
- Croft, Darin A.; Flynn, John J.; Wyss, André R. (2008), "The Tinguiririca fauna of Chile and the early stages of "modernization" of South American mammal faunas" (PDF), Arquivos do Museu Nacional, Rio de Janeiro, 66: 191–211
- Engelman, Russell K.; Flynn, John J.; Gans, Philip; Wyss, André R.; Croft, Darin A. (2018), "Chlorocyon phantasma, a late Eocene borhyaenoid (Mammalia, Metatheria, Sparassodonta) from the Los Helados locality, Andean Main Range, central Chile", American Museum Novitates (3918): 1–22, doi:10.1206/3918.1
- Godoy, Estanislao (2012), "Sobre el variable marco geotectónico de las formaciones Abanico y Farellones y sus equivalentes al sur de los 35°LS", Revista de la Asociación Geológica Argentina, 69: 570–577
- Muñoz, Marcia; Fuentes, Francisco; Vergara, Mario; Aguirre, Luis; Nyström, Jan Olov; Féraud, Gilbert; Demant, Alain (2006), "Abanico East Formation: petrology and geochemistry of volcanic rocks behind the Cenozoic arc front in the Andean Cordillera, central Chile (33°50'S)", Revista Geológica de Chile, 33: 109–140, doi:10.4067/S0716-02082006000100005, hdl:10533/177368

Bahía Inglesa Formation

- Achurra, L.E.; Lacassie, J.P.; Le Roux, J.P.; Marquadt, C.; Belmar, M.; Ruiz Del Solar, J.; Ishman, S.E. (2009), "Manganese nodules in the Miocene Bahía Inglesa Formation, north-central Chile: Petrography, geochemistry, genesis and palaeoceanographic significance" (PDF), Sedimentary Geology, 217 (1): 128–139, Bibcode:2009SedG..217..128A, doi:10.1016/j.sedgeo.2009.03.016
- Achurra, L.; Marquadt, C.; Lacassie, J.P.; Le Roux, J.P. (2003), Nódulos de Mn de la Formación Bahía Inglesa: geoquímica, génesis e implicancias paleoambientales (PDF), X Congreso Geológico Chileno, pp. 1–10, archived from the original (PDF) on 2017-10-26
- Acosta Hospitaleche, Carolina; Canto, Jhoann (2005), "Primer registro de cráneos asignados a Palaeospheniscus (Aves, Spheniscidae) procedentes de la Formación Bahía Inglesa (Mioceno Medio-Tardío), Chile" (PDF), Revista Chilena de Historia Natural, 78: 489–495
- Benson, Richard D (2015), "A new species of penguin from the late Miocene of Chile, with comments on the stratigraphic range of Palaeospheniscus" (PDF), Scientific Publications of the Science Museum of Minnesota, New Series, 8 (4): 5–22
- Chávez Hoffmeister, Martín Felipe (2008), La ornitofauna de la Formación Bahía Inglesa, Caldera, Chile (MSc. thesis) (PDF), Universidad Austral de Chile, pp. 1–165
- Chávez, Martín F (2007), "Sobre la presencia de Paraptenodytes y Palaeospheniscus (Aves: Sphenisciformes) en la Formación Bahía Inglesa, Chile" (PDF), Revista Chilena de Historia Natural, 80 (2): 255–259, doi:10.4067/S0716-078X2007000200010
- Chávez, Martín (2007), "Spheniscus megaramphus Stucchi et al. 2003 (Aves: Sphenisciformes) en la Formación Bahía Inglesa, Chile", Boletín Sociedad Geológica del Perú, 102: 101–107
- Le Roux, Jacobus P.; Achurra, Luciano; Henríquez, Álvaro; Carreño, Catalina; Rivera, Huber; Suárez, Mario E.; Ishman, Scott E.; Pyenson, Nicholas D.; Gutstein, Carolina S. (2016), "Oroclinal bending of the Juan Fernández Ridge suggested by geohistory analysis of the Bahía Inglesa Formation, north-central Chile" (PDF), Sedimentary Geology, 333: 32–49, Bibcode:2016SedG..333...32L, doi:10.1016/j.sedgeo.2015.12.003
- Le Roux, Jacobus P.; Achurra, Luciano; Henríquez, Álvaro; Carreño, Catalina; Rivera, Huber (2015), Lithostratigraphy, depositional environments and tectonic setting of the Bahía Inglesa Formation west of Copiapó, north-central Chile (PDF), XIV Congreso Geológico Chileno, pp. 821–824, archived from the original (PDF) on 2017-10-26
- Oyanadel Urbina, Pablo; Carrillo Briceño, Jorge; Villafaña, Jaime; Castelleto, Victor; Varas, Cristian; Alballay, Alex; Rivadeneira, Marcelo (2015), Nuevo registro de familias de peces óseos en Formación Bahía Inglesa (PDF), XIV Congreso Geológico Chileno, pp. 1–4, archived from the original (PDF) on 2017-10-26
- Staig, Felipe; Hernández, Sebastián; López, Patricio; Villafaña, Jaime A.; Varas, Cristian; Soto, Luis Patricio; Carrillo Briceño, Jorge D. (2015), "Late Neogene Elasmobranch fauna from the Coquimbo Formation, Chile", Revista Brasileira de Paleontologia, 18 (2): 261–272, Bibcode:2015RvBrP..18..261S, doi:10.4072/rbp.2015.2.07
- Suárez, Mario E (2011), Línea de base paleontológica proyecto Puerto Santa Fe (PDF), Comuna de Caldera Región de Atacama, pp. 1–29
- Valenzuela Toro, Ana; Gutstein, Carolina S., Mamíferos marinos fósiles (excepto Cetacea) de Formación Bahía Inglesa: Registro, implicancias paleoambientales y perspectivas de estudio (PDF), vol. ., pp. 770–772, archived from the original (PDF) on 2017-10-26

Caleta Herradura Formation

- Di Celma, Claudio; Cantalamessa, Gino (2007), "Sedimentology and high-frequency sequence stratigraphy of a forearc extensional basin: The Miocene Caleta Herradura Formation, Mejillones Peninsula, northern Chile", Sedimentary Geology, 198 (1–2): 29–52, Bibcode:2007SedG..198...29D, doi:10.1016/j.sedgeo.2006.11.003

Chíu-Chíu Formation

- López Mendoza, Patricio; Rojas, Osvaldo; Mansilla, Pablo; Olivares, Luis; Martínez, Ismael (2010), "Mamíferos extintos del Pleistoceno de la Cuenca de Calama (Segunda Región, Chile). Viejas colecciones y nuevos hallazgos", Treballs del Museo Geológico de Barcelona, 17: 11–25

Chucal Formation

- Croft, Darin A.; Flynn, John J.; Wyss, André R. (2007), "A new basal Glyptodontid and other Xenarthra of the Early Miocene Chucal Fauna, northern Chile", Journal of Vertebrate Paleontology, 21 (4): 781–797, doi:10.1671/0272-4634(2007)27[781:ANBGAO]2.0.CO;2

Coquimbo Formation

- Le Roux, J.P.; Olivares, Danisa M.; Nielsen, Sven N.; Smith, Norman D.; Middleton, Heather; Fenner, Juliane; Ishman, Scott E. (2006), "Bay sedimentation as controlled by regional crustal behaviour, local tectonics and eustatic sea-level changes: Coquimbo Formation (Miocene–Pliocene), Bay of Tongoy, central Chile" (PDF), Sedimentary Geology, 184 (1–2): 133–153, Bibcode:2006SedG..184..133L, doi:10.1016/j.sedgeo.2005.09.023

Cura-Mallín Group

- Flynn, John J.; Charrier, Reynaldo; Croft, Darin A.; Gans, Phillip B.; Herriott, Trystan M.; Wertheim, Jill A.; Wyss, André R. (2008), "Chronologic implications of new Miocene mammals from the Cura-Mallín and Trapa Trapa formations, Laguna del Laja area, south central Chile" (PDF), Journal of South American Earth Sciences, 26 (4): 412–423, Bibcode:2008JSAES..26..412F, doi:10.1016/j.jsames.2008.05.006
- Shockey, Bruce J.; Flynn, John J.; Croft, Darin A.; Gans, Phillip; Wyss, André R. (2012), "New leontiniid Notoungulata (Mammalia) from Chile and Argentina: comparative anatomy, character analysis, and phylogenetic hypotheses", American Museum Novitates (3737): 1–64, doi:10.1206/3737.2, hdl:2246/6161
- Utgé, Silvana; Folguera, Andrés; Litvak, Vanesa; Ramos, Víctor A. (2009), "Geología del sector norte de la Cuenca de Cura Mallín en las Lagunas de Epulaufquen, Neuquén", Revista de la Asociación Geológica Argentina, 64 (2): 231–248

Horcón Formation

- Carrillo Briceño, Jorge D.; González Barba, Gerardo; Landaeta, Mauricio F.; Nielsen, Sven N. (2013), "Condrictios fósiles del Plioceno Superior de la Formación Horcón, Región de Valparaíso, Chile central" (PDF), Revista Chilena de Historia Natural, 86 (2): 191–206, Bibcode:2013RvCHN..86..191C, doi:10.4067/S0716-078X2013000200008

Huaylas Formation

- García, Marcelo; Herail, Gérard; Charrier, Reynaldo (1999), Age and structure of the Oxaya Anticline: A major feature of the Miocene compressive structures of northernmost Chile (PDF), Fourth ISAG conference, Goettingen, Germany, pp. 249–252
- Montoya Sanhueza, Germán; Moreno, Karen; Bobe, René; Carrano, Matthew T.; García, Marcelo; Corgne, Alexandre (2017), "Peltephilidae and Mesotheriidae (Mammalia) from late Miocene strata of Northern Chilean Andes, Caragua", Journal of South American Earth Sciences, 75: 51–65, Bibcode:2017JSAES..75...51M, doi:10.1016/j.jsames.2017.01.009

Loreto Formation

- Bostelmann, Enrique; Le Roux, Jacobus P.; Vasquez, Ana; Gutiérrez, Nestor; Oyarzún, José Luis; Carreño, Catalina; Torres, Teresa; Otero, Rodrigo; Llanos, C. Mark Fanning, Sven N. Nielsen and Francisco Hervé, Andrea (2012), A revised lithostratigraphy of the Sierra Baguales, Magallanes Basin (PDF), XIII Congeso Geológico Chileno, pp. 698–700, archived from the original (PDF) on 2018-11-03
- Otero, Rodrigo A.; Torres, Teresa; Le Roux, Jacobus P.; Hervé, Francisco; Fanning, C. Mark; Yuri Yáñez, Roberto E.; Rubilar Rogers, David (2012), "A Late Eocene age proposal for the Loreto Formation (Brunswick Peninsula, southernmost Chile), based on fossil cartilaginous fishes, paleobotany and radiometric evidence" (PDF), Andean Geology, 39: 180–200, Bibcode:2012AndGe..39a...9O, doi:10.5027/andgeoV39N1-a09
- Sallaberry, M.A.; Yury Yáñez, R.E.; Otero, R.A.; Soto Acuña, S.; Torres, T.G. (2010), "Eocene birds from the western margin of southernmost South America" (PDF), Journal of Paleontology, 84 (6): 1061–1070, Bibcode:2010JPal...84.1061S, doi:10.1666/09-157.1
- Torres, T.; Meón, H.; Otero, R.; Galleguillos, H. (2009), Palinoflora y macroflora de la Formación Loreto, Punta Arenas, Región de Magallanes, Chile (PDF), XII Congreso Geológico Chileno, pp. 1–4

Navidad Formation

- Finger, Kenneth L.; Nielsen, Sven N.; DeVries, Thomas J.; Encinas, Alfonso; Peterson, Dawn E. (2007), "Paleontologic evidence for sedimentary displacement in Neogene forearc basins of central Chile" (PDF), PALAIOS, 22 (1): 3–16, Bibcode:2007Palai..22....3F, doi:10.2110/palo.2005.p05-081r

La Portada Formation

- Chávez, Martín F. (2008), Los pingüinos fósiles de Sudamérica, I Simposio - Paleontología Chile - 2008, pp. 116–120

Río Baguales Formation

- Le Roux, Jacobus P.; Puratich, Jacqueline; Mourgues, F. Amaro; Oyarzún, José Luis; Otero, Rodrigo A.; Torres, Teresa; Hervé, Francisco (2010), "Estuary deposits in the Río Baguales Formation (Chattian-Aquitanean), Magallanes Province, Chile" (PDF), Andean Geology, 37: 329–344

Río Frías Formation

- Abello, María Alejandra; Rubilar Rogers, David (2012), "Revisión del género Abderites Ameghino, 1887 (Marsupialia, Paucituberculata)", Ameghiniana, 49 (2): 164–184, Bibcode:2012Amegh..49..164A, doi:10.5710/AMGH.v49i2(408)
- Bellosi, Eduardo S. (2014), Ambientes asociados a la fauna Friasense (Mioceno Medio) en Alto río Cisnes (Aysén, Chile), XIV Reuñión Argentina de Sedimentología, pp. 40–41
- Bostelmann, J.E. (2012), The Alto Río Cisnes Fossil Fauna (Río Frías Formation, Early-Middle Miocene, Friasian SALMA): A keystone and paradigmatic vertebrate assemblage of the South American Fossil Record, III Simposio Paleontología en Chile, pp. 44–45
- Marshall, Larry G. (1990), "Fossil Marsupialia from the type Friasian land mammal age (Miocene), Alto Río Cisnes, Aisén, Chile", Revista Geológica de Chile, 17: 19–55
- Marshall, Larry G.; Salinas, Patricia (1990), "Stratigraphy of the Río Frías Formation (Miocene) along the Alto Río Cisnes, Aisén, Chile", Revista Geológica de Chile, 17: 57–87, archived from the original on May 21, 2018

==== Colombia ====
Altiplano Cundiboyacense

- Acosta Garay, Jorge E.; Ulloa Melo, Carlos E. (2002), Mapa Geológico del Departamento de Cundinamarca - 1:250,000 - Memoria explicativa, INGEOMINAS, pp. 1–108
- Amaya, Erika; Mariño, Jorge; Jaramillo, Carlos (2010), "Litofacies y ambientes de acumulación de la Formación Guaduas en al parte central de la Cordillera Oriental - implicaciones paleogeográficas", Boletín de Geología, Universidad Industrial de Santander, 32 (1): _
- Bayona, Germán; Montenegro, Omar; Cardona, Agustín; Jaramillo, Carlos; Lamus, Felipe; Morón, Sara; Quiroz, Luiz; Ruíz, María C.; Valencia & Mauricio Parra, Victor (2010), "Estratigrafía, procedencia, subsidencia y exhumación de las unidades paleógenas en el Sinclinal de Usme, sur de la zona axial de la Cordillera Oriental - Stratigraphy, provenance, subsidence and exhumation of the Paleogene succession in the Usme Syncline, southern axial zone of the Eastern Cordillera" (PDF), Geología Colombiana, 35: 5–35
- Bloch, Jonathan Ivan; Cadena, Edwin; Hastings, Alexander; Rincón, Aldo F.; Jaramillo, Carlos (2008), "Vertebrate faunas from the Paleocene Bogotá Formation of northern Colombia (Abstract)", Journal of Vertebrate Paleontology, Society of Vertebrate Paleontology, 68th Annual Meeting: _
- Cadena, Edwin A (2014), "The fossil record of turtles in Colombia; a review of the discoveries, research and future challenges" (PDF), Acta Biológica Colombiana, Universidad Nacional de Colombia, 19 (3): 333–339, Bibcode:2014AcBC...19..333C, doi:10.15446/abc.v19n3.42223
- Guerrero Uscátegui, Alberto Lobo (1992), Geología e Hidrogeología de Santafé de Bogotá y su Sabana, Sociedad Colombiana de Ingenieros, pp. 1–20
- Head, Jason J.; Bloch, Jonathan Ivan; Rincón, Aldo F.; Moreno Bernal, Jorge W. (2012), "Paleogene Squamates from the Northern neotropics: Ecological Implications and Biogeographic Histories (Abstract)", Journal of Vertebrate Paleontology, 72nd Annual Meeting of the Society of vertebrate Paleontology, At Raleigh, North Carolina: _
- Head, Jason J.; Bloch, Jonathan Ivan; Rincón, Aldo F.; Bourque, Jason R.; Jaramillo, Carlos (2011), "An enigmatic derived snake from the earliest Eocene of equatorial South America (Abstract)", Journal of Vertebrate Paleontology, Society of Vertebrate Paleontology, 71st Annual Meeting, Las Vegas, NV: _
- Herrera, Fabiany; Manchester, Steven R.; Carvalho, Mónica R.; Jaramillo, Carlos; Wings, Scott L. (2014), "Paleocene wind-dispersed fruits and seeds from Colombia and their implications for early Neotropical rainforests" (PDF), Acta Paleobotanica, 54 (2): 197–229, doi:10.2478/acpa-2014-0008
- Montoya Arenas, Diana María; Reyes Torres, Germán Alfonso (2005), Geología de la Sabana de Bogotá, INGEOMINAS, pp. 1–104
- Villarroel, Carlos; Concha, Ana Elena; Macía, Carlos (2001), "El Lago Pleistoceno de Soatá (Boyacá, Colombia): Consideraciones estratigráficas, paleontológicas y paleoecológicas", Geología Colombiana, 26, Universidad Nacional de Colombia: 79–93
- Villarroel A., Carlos (1987), "Características y afinadas de Etayoa n. gen., tipo de una nueva familia de Xenungulata (Mammalia) del Paleoceno Medio (?) de Colombia" (PDF), Comunicaciones Paleontológicas del Museo de Historia Natural de Montevideo, 19: 241–254

Cesar-Ranchería Basin

- Ayala Calvo, Rosa Carolina (2009), Análisis tectonoestratigráfico y de procedencia en la Subcuenca de Cesar: Relación con los sistemas petroleros (MSc.) (PDF), Universidad Simón Bolívar, pp. 1–255
- Cadena, Edwin A.; Schweitzer, Mary H. (2014), "A Pelomedusoid Turtle from the Paleocene–Eocene of Colombia Exhibiting Preservation of Blood Vessels and Osteocytes", Journal of Herpetology, 48 (4): 461–465, doi:10.1670/13-046
- Cadena, Edwin A.; Ksepka, Daniel T.; Jaramillo, Carlos A.; Bloch, Jonathan I. (2012a), "New pelomedusoid turtles from the late Palaeocene Cerrejón Formation of Colombia and their implications for phylogeny and body size evolution" (PDF), Journal of Systematic Palaeontology, 10 (2): 313–331, Bibcode:2012JSPal..10..313C, doi:10.1080/14772019.2011.569031
- Cadena, Edwin A.; Bloch, Jonathan I.; Jaramillo, Carlos A. (2012b), "New bothremydid turtle (Testudines, Pleurodira) from the Paleocene of northeastern Colombia", Journal of Paleontology, 86 (4): 688–698, Bibcode:2012JPal...86..688C, doi:10.1666/11-128R1.1
- Cadena, Edwin A.; Bloch, Jonathan I.; Jaramillo, Carlos A. (2010), "New Podocnemidid Turtle (Testudines: Pleurodira) from the Middle-Upper Paleocene of South America", Journal of Vertebrate Paleontology, 30 (2): 367–382, Bibcode:2010JVPal..30..367C, doi:10.1080/02724631003621946
- Hastings, Alexander K.; Bloch, Jonathan I.; Jaramillo, Carlos A. (2014), "A new blunt-snouted dyrosaurid, Anthracosuchus balrogus gen. et sp. nov. (Crocodylomorpha, Mesoeucrocodylia), from the Palaeocene of Colombia" (PDF), Historical Biology, 27 (8): 998–1020, Bibcode:2015HBio...27..998H, doi:10.1080/08912963.2014.918968
- Hastings, Alexander K.; Bloch, Jonathan I.; Jaramillo, Carlos A. (2011), "A new longirostrine Dyrosaurid (Crocodylomorpha, Mesoeucrocodylia) from the Paleocene of north-eastern Colombia: Biogeographocal and behavioural implications for New-World Dyrosayridae" (PDF), Palaeontology, 54: 1095–1116, doi:10.1111/j.1475-4983.2011.01092.x
- Head, J.J.; Bloch, J.I.; Hastings, A.K.; Bourque, J.R.; Cadena, E.A.; Herrera, F.A.; Polly, P.D.; Jaramillo, C.A. (2009), "Giant boid snake from the paleocene neotropics reveals hotter past equatorial temperatures", Nature, 457 (7230): 715–718, Bibcode:2009Natur.457..715H, doi:10.1038/nature07671, PMID 19194448
- Herrera, Fabiany A.; Jaramillo, Carlos A.; Dilcher, David L.; Wing, Scott L.; Gómez N, Carolina (2008), "Fossil Araceae from a Paleocene neotropical rainforest in Colombia", American Journal of Botany, 95 (12): 1569–1583, Bibcode:2008AmJB...95.1569H, doi:10.3732/ajb.0800172, PMID 21628164
- Hernández, Marina (2003), Geología de la Plancha 48 La Jagua de Ibírico - 1:100,000, INGEOMINAS, pp. 1–102
- Jaramillo, Carlos A.; Bayona, Germán; Pardo Trujillo, Andres; Rueda, Milton; Torres, Vladimir; Harrington, Guy J.; Mora, Germán (2007), "The palynology of the Cerrejón Formation (Upper Paleocene) of northern Colombia" (PDF), Palynology, 31 (1): 153–189, Bibcode:2007Paly...31..153J, doi:10.2113/gspalynol.31.1.153
- Ojeda Marulanda, Carolina; Sánchez Quiñónez, Carlos Alberto (2013), "Petrografía, petrología y análisis de procedencia de unidades paleógenas en las cuencas Cesar - Ranchería y Catatumbo" (PDF), Boletín de Geología, Universidad Industrial de Santander, 35: 67–80
- Wing, Scott L.; Herrera, Fabiany; Jaramillo, Carlos A.; Gómez Navarro, Carolina; Wilf, Peter; Labandeira, Conrad C. (2009), "Late Paleocene fossils from the Cerrejón Formation, Columbia ((sic)), are the earliest record of Neotropical rainforest", Proceedings of the National Academy of Sciences, 106 (44): 18627–18632, Bibcode:2009PNAS..10618627W, doi:10.1073/pnas.0905130106, PMC 2762419, PMID 19833876

Cocinetas Basin

- Amson, Eli; Carrillo, Juan D.; Jaramillo, Carlos (2016), "Neogene sloth assemblages (Mammalia, Pilosa) of the Cocinetas Basin (La Guajira, Colombia): Implications for the Great American Biotic Interchange" (PDF), Palaeontology, 59 (4): 563–582, Bibcode:2016Palgy..59..563A, doi:10.1111/pala.12244
- Cadena, Edwin; Jaramillo, Carlos (2015), "Early to middle Miocene turtles from the northernmost tip of South America: giant testudinids, chelids, and podocnemidids from the Castilletes Formation, Colombia" (PDF), Ameghiniana, 52 (2): 188–203, Bibcode:2015Amegh..52..188C, doi:10.5710/AMGH.10.11.2014.2835
- Carrillo, Juan D.; Amson, Eli; Jaramillo, Carlos; Sánchez, Rodolfo; Quiroz, Luis; Cuartas, Carlos; Rincón, Aldo F.; Sánchez Villagra, Marcelo R. (2018), "The Neogene record of northern South American native ungulates", Smithsonian Contributions to Paleobiology, 101: 1–67
- Carrillo Briceño, Jorge D.; Argyriou, Thodoris; Zapata, Vladimir; Kindlimann, René; Jaramillo, Carlos (2016), "A New Early Miocene (Aquitanian) Elasmobranchii Assemblage from the la Guajira Peninsula, Colombia" (PDF), Ameghiniana, 53 (2): 77–99, Bibcode:2016Amegh..53...77C, doi:10.5710/AMGH.26.10.2015.2931
- Hendy, Austin J.W.; Jones, Douglas S.; Moreno, Federico; Zapata, Vladimir; Jaramillo, Carlos (2015), "Neogene molluscs, shallow marine paleoenvironments, and chronostratigraphy of the Guajira Peninsula, Colombia" (PDF), Swiss Journal of Palaeontology, 134 (1): 45–75, Bibcode:2015SwJP..134...45H, doi:10.1007/s13358-015-0074-1
- Moreno, F.; Hendy, A.J.W.; Quiroz, L.; Hoyos, N.; Jones, D.S.; Zapata, V.; Zapata, S.; Ballen, G.A.; Cadena, A.L. Cárdenas, J.D. Carrillo Briceño, J.D. Carrillo, D. Delgado Sierra, J. Escobar, J.I. Martínez, C. Martínez, C. Montes, J. Moreno, N. Pérez, R. Sánchez, C. Suárez, M.C. Vallejo Pareja, C. Jaramillo, Edwin (2015), "Revised stratigraphy of Neogene strata in the Cocinetas Basin, La Guajira, Colombia" (PDF), Swiss Journal of Palaeontology, 134 (1): 5–43, Bibcode:2015SwJP..134....5M, doi:10.1007/s13358-015-0071-4
- Moreno Bernal, Jorge W (2014), Fossil Crocodilians from the High Guajira Peninsula of Colombia, and the History of Neogene Crocodilian Diversity in Tropical South America, University of Nebraska–Lincoln, pp. 1–66
- Pérez, María E.; Vallejo Pareja, María C.; Carrillo, Juan D.; Jaramillo, Carlos (2017), "A New Pliocene Capybara (Rodentia, Caviidae) from Northern South America (Guajira, Colombia), and its Implications for the Great American Biotic Interchange", Journal of Mammalian Evolution, 24: 111–125, doi:10.1007/s10914-016-9356-7, hdl:11336/46771
- Suárez, Catalina; Forasiepi, AnalÍa M.; Goin, Francisco J.; Jaramillo, Carlos (2015), "Insights into the Neotropics Prior to the Great American Biotic Interchange: new evidence of mammalian predators from the Miocene of Northern Colombia" (PDF), Journal of Vertebrate Paleontology, 36 (1) e1029581, doi:10.1080/02724634.2015.1029581, hdl:11336/53653

Barzalosa Formation

- Acosta, Jorge E.; Guatame, Rafael; Caicedo A., Juan Carlos; Cárdenas, Jorge Ignacio (2002), Mapa Geológico de Colombia - Plancha 245 - Girardot - 1:100,000 - Memoria Explicativa, INGEOMINAS, pp. 1–92

Gualanday Group

- Billet, Guillaume; Orliac, Maëva; Antoine, Pierre-Olivier; Jaramillo, Carlos (2010), "New observations and reinterpretation on the enigmatic taxon Colombitherium (?Pyrotheria, Mammalia) from Colombia" (PDF), Palaeontology, 59 (2): 319–325, Bibcode:2010Palgy..53..319B, doi:10.1111/j.1475-4983.2010.00936.x

Honda Group

- Cadena, Edwin; Jaramillo, Carlos; Páramo, María E. (2008), "New material of Chelus colombiana (Testudines; Pleurodira) from the Lower Miocene of Colombia" (PDF), Journal of Vertebrate Paleontology, 28 (4): 1206–1212, Bibcode:2008JVPal..28.1206C, doi:10.1671/0272-4634-28.4.1206
- Croft, Darin A (2007), "The Middle Miocene (Laventan) Quebrada Honda Fauna, southern Bolivia and a description of its Notoungulates", Palaeontology, 50 (1): 277–303, Bibcode:2007Palgy..50..277C, doi:10.1111/j.1475-4983.2006.00610.x
- Czaplewski, Nicolas J.; Takai, Masanaru; Naeher, Tiffany M.; Shigehara, Nobuo; Setoguchi, Takeshi (2003), "Additional bats from the middle Miocene La Venta fauna of Colombia" (PDF), Revista Académica Colombiana de Ciencias Naturales, XXVII: 263–282
- Defler, Thomas (2004), Historia natural de los primates colombianos (PDF), Universidad Nacional de Colombia, pp. 1–613
- Estes, Richard; Wassersug, Richard (1963), "A Miocene toad from Colombia, South America" (PDF), Breviora, 193: 1–13, archived from the original (PDF) on 2015-03-19
- De la Fuente, Marcelo; Sterli, Juliana; Maniel, Ignacio (2013), Origin, Evolution and Biogeographic History of South American Turtles, Springer Science & Business Media, pp. 1–168, Bibcode:2014oebh.book.....D, ISBN 978-3-319-00518-8
- Hoffstetter, Robert (1971), Los vertebrados cenozóicos de Colombia: yacimientos, faunas, problemas planteados (PDF), Universidad Nacional de Colombia, pp. 37–62
- Hsiou, Annie S.; Albino, Adriana M.; Ferigolo, Jorge (2010), "Reappraisal of the south American Miocene snakes of the genus Colombophis, with description of a new species", Acta Palaeontologica Polonica, 55 (3): 365–379, Bibcode:2010AcPaP..55..365H, doi:10.4202/app.2009.1111
- Kay, Richard F.; Madden, Richard H. (1997), "Mammals and rainfall: paleoecology of the middle Miocene at La Venta (Colombia, South America)", Journal of Human Evolution, 32 (2–3): 161–199, Bibcode:1997JHumE..32..161K, doi:10.1006/jhev.1996.0104, PMID 9061556
- Lundberg, John G.; Chernoff, Barry (1992). "A Miocene Fossil of the Amazonian Fish Arapaima (Teleostei, Arampaimidae) from the Magdalena River Region of Colombia - Biogeographic and Evolutionary Implications" (PDF). Biotropica (FTP). pp. 2–16. Bibcode:1992Biotr..24....2L. doi:10.2307/2388468. JSTOR 2388468. (To view documents see Help:FTP)
- Marshall, Larry G (1976), "New Didelphine Marsupials from the La Venta Fauna (Miocene) of Colombia, South America", Journal of Paleontology, 50 (3): 402–418, JSTOR 1303521
- Meldrum, D.J.; Kay, R.F. (1997), "Nuciruptor rubricae, a new pitheciin seed predator from the Miocene of Colombia" (PDF), American Journal of Physical Anthropology, 102 (3): 407–427, doi:10.1002/(SICI)1096-8644(199703)102:3<407::AID-AJPA8>3.0.CO;2-R, PMID 9098507
- Miller, Alden H (1953), "A fossil Hoatzin from the Miocene of Colombia" (PDF), Auk, 70 (4): 484–495, doi:10.2307/4081360, JSTOR 4081360
- Organ, Jason M.; Lemelin, Pierre (2011), "Tail Architecture and Function of Cebupithecia sarmientoi, a Middle Miocene Platyrrhine from La Venta, Colombia", The Anatomical Record, 294 (12): 2013–2023, doi:10.1002/ar.21504, PMID 22042718
- Pardo Jaramillo, Mauricio (2010), "Reporte de un nuevo ejemplar de Granastrapotherium snorki en el Valle Superior del Magdalena, Desierto de la Tatacoa, Huila. Colombia" (PDF), Revista Académica Colombiana de Ciencias Naturales, 34: 253–256
- Rasmussen, Tab (1997), Vertebrate paleontology in the neotropics - the Miocene fauna of La Venta, Colombia, Smithsonian Institution Press, pp. _
- Rosenberger, A.L.; Setoguchi, T.; Hartwig, W.C. (1991), "Laventiana annectens, new genus and species: fossil evidence for the origins of callitrichine New World monkeys", Proceedings of the National Academy of Sciences of the United States of America, 88 (6): 2137–2140, Bibcode:1991PNAS...88.2137R, doi:10.1073/pnas.88.6.2137, PMC 51184, PMID 1900937
- Setoguchi, Takeshi; Rosenberger, Alfred L. (1988), "A fossil owl monkey from La Venta, Colombia" (PDF), Kyoto University Overseas Research Reports of New World Monkeys, 6: 1–6
- Setoguchi, T (1985), "Kondous laventicus, a new ceboid primate from the Miocene of the La Venta, Colombia, South America", Folia Primatol, 44 (2): 96–101, doi:10.1159/000156200, PMID 4043876
- Suárez, Catalina; Forasiepi, Analía M.; Goin, Franciso J.; Jaramillo, Carlos (2015), "Insights into the Neotropics prior to the Great American Biotic Interchange: new evidence of mammalian predators from the Miocene of Northern Colombia" (PDF), Journal of Vertebrate Paleontology, e1029581: 1–10
- Takai, Masanaru; Anaya, Federico; Suzuki, Hisashi; Shigehara, Nobuo; Setoguchi, Takeshi (2001), "A New Platyrrhine from the Middle Miocene of La Venta, Colombia, and the Phyletic Position of Callicebinae", Anthropological Science, Tokyo, 109 (4): 289, doi:10.1537/ase.109.289
- Takai, Masanaru; Setoguchi, Takeshi; Villarroel A., Carlos; Cadena G., Alberto; Shigehara, Nobuo (1991), "A New Miocene Molossid Bat from La Venta, Colombia, South America" (PDF), Memoirs of the Faculty of Science, Kyoto University. Series of Geology and Mineralogy, 56: 1–9
- Tejedor, Marcelo F (2013), "Sistemática, evolución y paleobiogeografía de los primates Platyrrhini" (PDF), Revista del Museo de La Plata, 20: 20–39
- Vallejo Pareja, M.C.; Carrillo, J.D.; Moreno Bernal, J.W.; Pardo Jaramillo, M.; Rodríguez González, D.F.; Muñoz Duran, J. (2015), "Hilarcotherium castanedaii, gen. et sp. nov., a new Miocene astrapothere (Mammalia, Astrapotheriidae) from the Upper Magdalena Valley, Colombia" (PDF), Zurich Open Repository and Archive, University of Zurich, 35 (2) e903960, Bibcode:2015JVPal..35E3960V, doi:10.1080/02724634.2014.903960
- Villarroel A., Carlos S (2000), "Un nuevo Mylodontinae (Xenarthra, Tardigrada) en la Fauna de La Venta, Mioceno de Colombia: el estado actual de la Familia Orophodontidae" (PDF), Revista de la Academia Colombiana de Ciencias Exactas, Físicas y Naturales, 24: 117–127
- Villarroel A., Carlos S (1997), "La Estructura de la Dentición Caduca de Huilatherium pluriplicatum, Leontiniidae (Notoungulata) del Mioceno de Colombia", Geología Colombiana, 22: 139–149
- Villarroel A., Carlos; Setoguchi, Takeshi; Brieva, Jorge; Macia, Carlos (1996), "Geology of the La Tatacoa "Desert" (Huila, Colombia): Precisions on the Stratigraphy of the Honda Group, the Evolution of the "Pata High" and the Presence of the La Venta Fauna" (PDF), Memoirs of the Faculty of Science, Kyoto University. Series of Geology and Mineralogy, 58: 41–66
- Wheeler, Brandon (2010), "Community ecology of the Middle Miocene primates of La Venta, Colombia: the relationship between ecological diversity, divergence time, and phylogenetic richness", Primates, 51 (2): 131–138, doi:10.1007/s10329-009-0181-y, PMID 20037832

Los Hoyos beds

- Villaroel A., Carlos; Brieva B., Jorge; Cadena, Alberto (1989), "Descubrimiento de mamíferos fósiles de edad Lujanense (Pleistoceno tardío) en el "Desierto" de la Tatacoa (Huila, Colombia)" (PDF), Caldasia, 16: 119–125

Mugrosa Formation

- Gómez, Luis Alfonso; Patiño, Alejandro; Renzoni, Giancarlo; Beltrán, Alejandro; Quintero, Claudia; Manrique, Martín (2008), Geología de la Plancha 119 Barrancabermeja - 1:100,000, INGEOMINAS, pp. 1–105

Rotinet Formation

- Páramo Fonseca, María Euridice; Escobar Quemba, Ingrid Carolina (2010), "Restos mandibulares de mastodonte encontrados en cercanías de Cartagena, Colombia" (PDF), Geología Colombiana, 35: 50–57

Sincelejo Formation

- Villarroel A., Carlos; Clavijo, Javier (2023), "Los mamíferos fósiles y las edades de las sedimentitas continentales del Neógeno de la Costa Caribe Colombiana" (PDF), Revista de la Academia Colombiana de Ciencias Exactas, Físicas y Naturales, 29 (112): 345–356, doi:10.18257/raccefyn.29(112).2005.2169

==== Ecuador ====
Biblián Formation

- Veintimilla González, Liliana Alexandra (2015), Solución geológica, geotécnica, hidrológica, hidráulica y estructural de la alcantarilla que sirve a la autopista Cuenca-Azogues, Abscisa km. 4+667 (thesis) (PDF), Universidad de Cuenca, pp. 1–111

Dos Bocas Formation

- Lorenzo, Erica; Roca Beltrán, Wladimir Andrés; Martínez, Manuel; Morato, Antonio; Escandón Panchana, Paulo César; Álvarez Domínguez, Cristian Paul (2018), "Correlación geoquímica entre crudos y rocas del sistema petrolero de la península de Santa Elena y el golfo de Guayaquil" (PDF), Boletín de Geología, 40: 31–42, doi:10.18273/revbol.v40n1-2018002
- Tanaka, Yoshihiro; Abella, Juan; Aguirre Fernández, Gabriel; Gregori, María; Fordyce, R. Ewan (2017), "A new tropical Oligocene dolphin from Montañita/Olón, Santa Elena, Ecuador", PLoS ONE, 12 (12) e0188380, Bibcode:2017PLoSO..1288380T, doi:10.1371/journal.pone.0188380, PMC 5737981, PMID 29261688

Letrero Formation

- Romero Carrasco, Ana Iveth (2017), Marcas de herbivoría en hojas fósiles de las cuencas miocénicas del sur del Ecuador (BSc. thesis) (PDF), Universidad Central del Ecuador, pp. 1–39

Onzole Formation

- Ramírez Parrales, María Fernanda (2013), Registros de la deformación y del volcanismo en el dominio del antearco ecuatoriano: sedimentología y bioestratigrafía de la Formación Borbón (thesis) (PDF), Escuela Superior Politecnica del Litoral, pp. 1–202

Seca Formation

- Lorenzo, Erica (2018), "Correlación geoquímica entre crudos y rocas del sistema petrolero de la península de Santa Elena y el golfo de Guayaquil" (PDF), Boletín de Geología, 40: 31–42, doi:10.18273/revbol.v40n1-2018002

==== Paraguay ====
Chaco Formation

- Filí, M.F (2001), "Síntesis Geológica e Hidrogeológica del noroeste de la provincia de Entre Ríos - República Argentina" (PDF), Boletín Geológico y Minero, 112: 25–36
- Various, Authors (1986), Mapa Geológico del Paraguay - Proyecto PAR 86 - Escala 1:1,000,000 - Texto explicativo (PDF), _, pp. 1–62

==== Peru ====
Peruvian Amazon

- Antoine, Pierre-Olivier; Abello, M. Alejandra; Adnet, Sylvain; Altamirano Sierra, Ali J.; Baby, Patrice; Billet, Guillaume; Boivin, Myriam; Calderón, Ysabel; Candela, Jules Chabain, Fernando Corfu, Darin A. Croft, Morgan Ganerød, Carlos Jaramillo, Sebastian Klaus, Laurent Marivaux, Rosa E. Navarrete, Maëva J. Orliac, Francisco Parra, María Encarnación Pérez, François Pujos, Jean-Claude Rage, Anthony Ravel, Céline Robinet, Martin Roddaz, Julia Victoria Tejada Lara, Jorge Vélez Juarbe, Frank P. Wesselingh, Rodolfo Salas Gismondi, Adriana (2016), "A 60-million-year Cenozoic history of western Amazonian ecosystems in Contamana, eastern Peru", Gondwana Research, 31: 30–59, Bibcode:2016GondR..31...30A, doi:10.1016/j.gr.2015.11.001, hdl:11336/99030
- Castro Medina, Walter Fidel (2010), Geología, informe temático. Proyecto Zonificación Ecológica y Económica del departamento de Amazonas (PDF), Instituto de Investigaciones de la Amazonía Peruana (IIAP), pp. 1–76

Sechura Basin

- Córdova Aguilar, Arturo (2009), Proyecto: "desarrollo de capacidades para una propuesta de zoneamiento ecológico económica (ZEE) para el ordenamiento territorial del Departamento de Piura" - área: Geología y potencial de recursos mineros (PDF), Ministry of Environment, Peru, pp. 1–83

Chambira Formation

- Boivin, Myriam; Marivaux, Laurent; Antoine, Pierre-Olivier (2019), "New insight from the Paleogene record of Amazonia into the early diversification of Caviomorpha (Hystricognathi, Rodentia): phylogenetic, macroevolutionary, and paleobiogeographic implications", Geodiversitas, 41 (4): 143–245, doi:10.5252/geodiversitas2019v41a4
- Boivin, Myriam; Marivaux, Laurent; Candela, Adriana M.; Orliac, Maëva J.; Pujos, François; Salas Gismondi, Rodolfo; Tejada Lara, Julia V.; Antoine, Pierre-Olivier (2016), "Late Oligocene caviomorph rodents from Contamana, Peruvian Amazonia", Papers in Palaeontology, 3 (1): 69–109, doi:10.1002/spp2.1068, hdl:11336/63600
- Marivaux, Laurent; Adnet, Sylvain; Altamirano Sierra, Ali J.; Boivin, Myriam; Pujos, François; Ramdarshan, Anusha; Salas Gismondi, Rodolfo; Tejada, Julia; Antoine, Pierre-Olivier (2016), "Neotropics provide insights into the emergence of New World monkeys: New dental evidence from the late Oligocene of Peruvian Amazonia", Journal of Human Evolution, 97: 159–175, Bibcode:2016JHumE..97..159M, doi:10.1016/j.jhevol.2016.05.011, hdl:11336/182832, PMID 27457552

Chilcatay Formation

- Bianucci, Giovanni; Bosio, Giulia; Malinverno, Elisa; De Muizon, Christian; Villa, Igor M.; Urbina, Mario; Lambert, Olivier (2018), "A new large squalodelphinid (Cetacea, Odontoceti) from Peru sheds light on the Early Miocene platanistoid disparity and ecology", Royal Society Open Science, 5 (4) 172302, Bibcode:2018RSOS....572302B, doi:10.1098/rsos.172302, PMC 5936943, PMID 29765678
- De la Cruz, Aldo Alván (2008), "Geología de Ocucaje: aportes en la sedimentología y paleontología de Lomas de Ullujaya (Ica, Perú)" (PDF), Revista del Instituto de Investigaciones FIGMMG, 11: 51–59
- Lambert, Olivier; De Muizon, Christian; Malinverno, Elisa; Di Celma, Claudio; Urbina, Mario; Bianucci, Giovanni (2017), "A new odontocete (toothed cetacean) from the Early Miocene of Peru expands the morphological disparity of extinct heterodont dolphins", Journal of Systematic Palaeontology, 16 (12): 981–1016, doi:10.1080/14772019.2017.1359689, hdl:11568/891482
- Lambert, Olivier; Bianucci, Giovanni; Urbina, Mario (2014), "Huaridelphis raimondii, a new early Miocene Squalodelphinidae (Cetacea, Odontoceti) from the Chilcatay Formation, Peru", Journal of Vertebrate Paleontology, 34 (5): 987–1004, Bibcode:2014JVPal..34..987L, doi:10.1080/02724634.2014.858050

Chota Formation

- Chacaltana, César; Benites Cañote, Alexandra Lucytania; Valdivia, Waldir; Chumpitaz, Marco (2014), La formación Chota en la Cuenca Bagua: Evaluación e implicancias del criterio de clasificación litoestratigráfico, Congreso Peruano de Geología, pp. 1–4

Iñapari Formation

- Frailey, Carl D (1986), "Late Miocene and Holocene mammals, exclusive of the Notoungulata, of the Rio Acre Region, western Amazonia" (PDF), Contributions in Science, 374: 1–46, doi:10.5962/p.208117
- De Iullis, Gerardo; Gaudin, Timothy J.; Vicars, Matthew J. (2011), "A new genus and species of nothrotheriid sloth (Xenarthra, Tardigrada, Nothrotheriidae) from the Late Miocene (Huayquerian) of Peru", Palaeontology, 54 (1): 171–205, Bibcode:2011Palgy..54..171D, doi:10.1111/j.1475-4983.2010.01001.x

Madre de Dios Formation

- Frailey, Carl David; Campbell Jr., Kenneth E. (2012), "Two New Genera of Peccaries (Mammalia, Artiodactyla, Tayassuidae) from Upper Miocene Deposits of the Amazon Basin", Journal of Paleontology, 86 (5): 852–877, Bibcode:2012JPal...86..852F, doi:10.1666/12-012.1
- Prothero, Donald R.; Campbell, Jr, Kenneth E.; Beatty, Brian L.; Frailey, Carl D. (2014), "New late Miocene dromomerycine artiodactyl from the Amazon Basin: implications for interchange dynamics", Journal of Paleontology, 88 (3): 434–443, doi:10.1666/13-022
- Romero P., Lidia; Morales R., María del Carmen; Carpio R, Mario (1998), Geología de los cuadrángulos de Río Acre 22-v, Iñapari 22-x, Qda. Mala 23-v, Iberia 23-x, San Lorenzo 23-y, Puerto Lidia 24-v, Río Manuripe 24-x, Mavila 24-y, Santa María 24-z, Valencia 25-z, Palma Real 26-z y Río Heath 27-z (PDF), INGEMMET, pp. 1–201

Mogollón Formation

- Antoine, Pierre-Olivier; Billet, Guillaume; Salas Gismondi, Rodolfo; Tejada Lara, Julia; Baby, Patrice; Brusset, Stéphane; Espurt, Nicolas (2015), "A New Carodnia Simpson, 1935 (Mammalia, Xenungulata) from the Early Eocene of Northwestern Peru and a Phylogeny of Xenungulates at Species Level", Journal of Mammalian Evolution, 22 (2): 129–140, doi:10.1007/s10914-014-9278-1
- Quispe Alcalá, David Ricardo (2010), Evaluación Geológica de la Formación Mogollón en el Yacimiento Leones – Cuenca Talara (MSc. thesis) (PDF), Universidad Nacional de Ingeniería, pp. 1–87

Moquegua Formation

- Alván, Aldo; Ramírez, Katerin; von Eynatten, Hilmar; Dunkl, István; Jacay, Javier; Bertone, Gabriela (2017), "Evolución Geológica de las Cuencas de Antearco del Sur de Perú (Moquegua y Camaná-Mollendo): Proveniencia Sedimentaria y Análisis de Facies en Rocas Cenozoicas", Boletín de la Sociedad Geológica del Perú, 112: 53–77
- Shockey, Bruce J.; Billet, Guillaume; Salas Gismondi, Rodolfo (2016), "A new species of Trachytherus (Notoungulata: Mesotheriidae) from the late Oligocene (Deseadan) of Southern Peru and the middle latitude diversification of early diverging mesotheriids", Zootaxa, 4111 (5): 565–583, doi:10.11646/zootaxa.4111.5.3, PMID 27395103

Muñani Formation

- Gelfo, Javier N.; Sigé, Bernard (2011), "A new didolodontid mammal from the late Paleocene–earliest Eocene of Laguna Umayo, Peru" (PDF), Acta Palaeontologica Polonica, 56 (4): 665–678, Bibcode:2011AcPaP..56..665G, doi:10.4202/app.2010.0067

Paracas Formation

- Clarke, Julia A.; Ksepka, Daniel T.; Stucchi, Marcelo; Urbina, Mario; Giannini, Norberto; Bertelli, Sara; Narváez, Yanina; Boyd, Clint A. (2007), "Paleogene equatorial penguins challenge the proposed relationship between penguin biogeography, body size evolution, and Cenozoic climate change", Proceedings of the National Academy of Sciences, 104 (28): 11545–11550, doi:10.1073/pnas.0611099104, PMC 1913862, PMID 17601778

Pisco Formation

- Altamirano Sierra, Alí J (2013), "Primer registro de pelicano (Aves: Pelecanidae) para el Mioceno tardio de la formacion Pisco, Peru" (PDF), Bulletin de l'Institut français d'études andines, 42: 1–12
- Báez Gómez, Diego A (2006), "Estudio paleoambiental de la formación Pisco:: Localidad Ocucaje" (PDF), Revista del Instituto de Investigaciones FIGMMG, 9: 64–69
- Bianucci, Giovanni; Di Celma, Claudio; Urbina, Mario; Lambert, Olivier (2016), "New beaked whales from the late Miocene of Peru and evidence for convergent evolution in stem and crown Ziphiidae (Cetacea, Odontoceti)" (PDF), PeerJ, 4 e2479, Bibcode:2016PeerJ...4e2479B, doi:10.7717/peerj.2479, PMC 5036081, PMID 27688973
- Brand, Leonard; Urbina, Mario; Chadwick, Arthur; DeVries, Thomas J.; Esperante, Raul (2011), "A high resolution stratigraphic framework for the remarkable fossil cetacean assemblage of the Miocene/Pliocene Pisco Formation, Peru", Journal of South American Earth Sciences, 31 (4): 414–425, Bibcode:2011JSAES..31..414B, doi:10.1016/j.jsames.2011.02.015
- Collareta, Alberto; Lambert, Olivier; De Muizon, Christian; Urbina, Mario; Bianucci, Giovanni (2017), "Koristocetus pescei gen. et sp. nov., a diminutive sperm whale (Cetacea: Odontoceti: Kogiidae) from the late Miocene of Peru", Fossil Record, 20 (2): 259–278, Bibcode:2017FossR..20..259C, doi:10.5194/fr-20-259-2017, hdl:11568/891486
- Lambert, Olivier; Bianucci, Giovanni; Urbina, Mario; Geisler, Jonathan H. (2017), "A new inioid (Cetacea, Odontoceti, Delphinida) from the Miocene of Peru and the origin of modern dolphin and porpoise families", Zoological Journal of the Linnean Society, 179 (4): 919–946
- Marx, Felix G.; Lambert, Olivier; De Muizon, Christian (2017), "A new Miocene baleen whale from Peru deciphers the dawn of cetotheriids", Royal Society Open Science, 4 (9) 170560, Bibcode:2017RSOS....470560M, doi:10.1098/rsos.170560, PMC 5627101, PMID 28989761
- Marx, Felix G.; Kohno, Naoki (2016), "A new Miocene baleen whale from the Peruvian desert", Royal Society Open Science, 3 (10) 160542, Bibcode:2016RSOS....360542M, doi:10.1098/rsos.160542, PMC 5098998, PMID 27853573
- Poma Porras, Orlando; Horna Santillán, Edgard; Esperante, Raúl (2009), "Baleen Fósil (Cetacea: mysticeti) en Sedimentos de la Cuenca Marina del Neógeno en la Formación Pisco, al Sur del Perú" (PDF), Revista de Investigación Universitaria, 1: 84–97
- Ramassamy, Benjamin; Lambert, Olivier; Collareta, Alberto; Urbina, Mario; Bianucci, Giovanni (2018), "Description of the skeleton of the fossil beaked whale Messapicetus gregarius: searching potential proxies for deep-diving abilities" (PDF), Fossil Record, 21 (1): 11–32, Bibcode:2018FossR..21...11R, doi:10.5194/fr-21-11-2018
- Solís Mundaca, Flavio Alejandro (2018), Bioestratigrafía e implicancias paleoceanográficas de las diatomeas de la sección Cerro Caucato, Formación Pisco, Ica, Peru (MSc. thesis) (PDF), Universidad Peruana Cayetano Heredia, pp. 1–158
- Stucchi, Marcelo; Emslie, Steven D.; Varas Malca, Rafael M.; Urbina Schmitt, Mario (2015a), "A new late Miocene condor (Aves, Cathartidae) from Peru and the origin of South American condors", Journal of Vertebrate Paleontology, 35 (5) e972507, Bibcode:2015JVPal..35E2507S, doi:10.1080/02724634.2015.972507
- Stucchi, Marcelo; Varas Malca, Rafael M.; Urbina Schmitt, Mario (2015b), "New Miocene sulid birds from Peru and considerations on their Neogene fossil record in the Eastern Pacific Ocean" (PDF), Acta Palaeontologica Polonica, 61 (2): 417–427
- Stucchi, M (2007), "Los pingüinos de la Formación Pisco (Neógeno), Perú" (PDF), 4th European Meeting on the Palaeontology and Stratigraphy of Latin America, Cuadernos del Museo Geominero, 8: 367–373

Pozo Formation

- Antoine, P.O.; Marivaux, L.; Croft, D.A.; Billet, G.; Ganerod, M.; Jaramillo, C.; Martin, T.; Orliac, M.; Tejada, A. J. Altamirano, F. Duranthon, G. Fanjat, S. Rousse and R. Salas Gismondi, J. (2011), "Middle Eocene rodents from Peruvian Amazonia reveal the pattern and timing of caviomorph origins and biogeography", Proceedings of the Royal Society B, 279 (1732): 1319–1326, doi:10.1098/rspb.2011.1732, PMC 3282368, PMID 21993503
- Boivin, Myriam; Marivaux, Laurent; Orliac, Maëva J.; Pujos, François; Salas Gismondi, Rodolfo; Tejada Lara, Julia V.; Antoine, Pierre-Olivier (2017), "Late middle Eocene caviomorph rodents from Contamana, Peruvian Amazonia", Palaeontologia Electronica, 20 (1): Article number 20.1.19A

Soncco Formation

- Carlotto, Víctor (2016), Dataciones por trazas de fisión en los depósitos continentales terciarios de la Región de Cusco, XIII Congreso Peruano de Geología, pp. 521–524

Yahuarango Formation

- Bond, Mariano; Tejedor, Marcelo F.; Campbell Jr., Kenneth E.; Chornogubsky, Laura; Novo, Nelson; Goin, Francisco (2015), "Eocene primates of South America and the African origins of New World monkeys", Nature, 520 (7548): 538–546, Bibcode:2015Natur.520..538B, doi:10.1038/nature14120, hdl:11336/79088, PMID 25652825
- Campbell, K.E.; Frailey, C.D.; Romero Pittman, L. (2004), "The Paleogene Santa Rosa Local Fauna of Amazonian Perú: Geographic and Geologic Setting" (PDF), Natural History Museum of Los Angeles County, Science Series, 40: 1–164
- Ciancio, Martín Ricardo; Carlini, Alfredo A.; Campbell, Kenneth E.; Scillato Yané, Gustavo J. (2013), "New Palaeogene cingulates (Mammalia, Xenarthra) from Santa Rosa, Perú and their importance in the context of South American faunas", Journal of Systematic Palaeontology, 11 (6): 727–741, Bibcode:2013JSPal..11..727C, doi:10.1080/14772019.2012.704949, hdl:11336/23283

Yumaque Formation

- Lambert, O.; Martínez Cáceres, M.; Bianucci, G.; Di Celma, C.; Salas Gismondi, R.; Steurbaut, E.; Urbina, Mario; de Muizon, C. (2017), "Earliest Mysticete from the Late Eocene of Peru Sheds New Light on the Origin of Baleen Whales", Current Biology, 27 (10): 1–7, Bibcode:2017CBio...27E1535L, doi:10.1016/j.cub.2017.04.026, hdl:11581/396095, PMID 28502655

==== Uruguay ====
Pleistocene

- Martínez, Sergio A.; Ubilla, M. (2009), El Cuaternario en Uruguay, Universidad de la República de Uruguay, pp. 195–228

Camacho Formation

- Fernicola, Juan C.; Rinderknecht, Andrés; Jones, Washington; Vizcaíno, Sergio F.; Propino, Kleberson (2018), "A new species of Neoglyptatelus (Mammalia, Xenarthra, Cingulata) from the late Miocene of Uruguay provides new insights on the evolution of the dorsal armor in cingulates", Ameghiniana, 55 (3): 233–252, doi:10.5710/AMGH.02.12.2017.3150, hdl:11336/96801
- Rinderknecht, Andrés (2011), Estudio sobre los roedores gigantes del Uruguay, Departamento de San José (Mioceno tardío-Pliocene) y sus implicancias para la sistemática y taxonomía de la familia Dinomyidae (Mammalia, Rodentia) (PDF), Universidad de la República, pp. 1–101
- Verde, Mariano (2002), Icnología de la formación Camacho (Mioceno tardío) del Uruguay (MSc. thesis) (PDF), Universidad de la República, pp. 1–125

Dolores Formation

- Alberdi, María Teresa; Prado, José Luis; Perea, Daniel; Ubilla, Martín (2007), "Stegomastodon waringi (Mammalia, Proboscidea) from the Late Pleistocene of northeastern Uruguay", Neues Jahrbuch für Geologie und Paläontologie - Abhandlungen, 243 (2): 179–189, Bibcode:2007NJGPA.243..179A, doi:10.1127/0077-7749/2007/0243-0179
- Alvarenga, Herculano; Jones, Washington; Rinderknecht, Andrés (2010), "The youngest record of phorusrhacid birds (Aves, Phorusrhacidae) from the late Pleistocene of Uruguay" (PDF), Neues Jahrbuch für Geologie und Paläontologie - Abhandlungen, 256 (2): 229–234, Bibcode:2010NJGPA.256..229A, doi:10.1127/0077-7749/2010/0052
- Gutiérrez, Mercedes; Prado, José Luis; Perea, Daniel; Ubilla, Martín (2005), "Late Pleistocene Stegomastodon (Mammalia, Proboscidea) from Uruguay", Neues Jahrbuch für Geologie und Paläontologie - Monatshefte, 2005 (11): 641–662, doi:10.1127/njgpm/2005/2005/641

Fray Bentos Formation

- Bond, Mariano; López, Guillermo; Reguero, Marcelo A.; Scillato Yané, Gustavo J.; Vucetich, María G. (1998), "Los mamíferos de la Formación Fray Bentos (Edad mamífero Deseadense, Oligoceno Superior) de las provincias de Corrientes y Entre Ríos, Argentina", Asociación Paleontológica Argentina. Publicación Especial, 5: 41–50
- Tófalo, Ofelia Rita; Morrás, Héctor J.M. (2009), "Evidencias paleoclimáticas en duricostras, paleosuelos y sedimentitas silicoclásticas, del Cenozoico de Uruguay" (PDF), Revista de la Asociación Geológica Argentina: 674–686

Raigón Formation

- Tófalo, Ofelia Rita; Morrás, Héctor J.M. (2009), "Evidencias paleoclimáticas en duricostras, paleosuelos y sedimentitas silicoclásticas, del Cenozoico de Uruguay" (PDF), Revista de la Asociación Geológica Argentina: 674–686

San José Formation

- Rinderknecht, Andrés; Noriega, Jorge Ignacio (2002), "A new genus of Anhingidae (Aves: Pelecaniformes) from the Pliocene-Pleistocene of Uruguay (San José Formation)", Ameghiniana, 39: 183–191

Sopas Formation

- Corona, Andrea; Ubilla, Martín; Perea, Daniel (2019), "New records and diet reconstruction using dental microwear analysis for Neolicaphrium recens Frenguelli, 1921 (Litopterna, Proterotheriidae)", Andean Geology, 46: 153–167, doi:10.5027/andgeoV46n1-3136, hdl:20.500.12008/22426

==== Venezuela ====
Chaguaramas Formation

- Horovitz, Inés; Sánchez Villagra, Marcelo R. (2012), El Registro Fósil del Cenozoico (PDF), Venezuela Paleontológica: Evolución de la diversidad en el pasado, pp. 133–156

Parángula Formation

- Paolillo, Alfredo; Linares, Omar J. (2007), "Nuevos cocodrilos Sebecosuchia del Cenozoico suramericano (Mesosuchia: Crocodylia)" (PDF), Paleobiología Neotropical, 03: 1–25

Falcón Basin
Cantaure & Paraguaná Formations

- Mendi, David; Rodríguez, Eliana (2005), Integración geológica de la Península de Paraguaná, Estado Falcón (MSc thesis), Universidad Central de Venezuela, pp. 1–184

Capadare Formation

- Ferreira, Gabriel S.; Rincón, Ascanio D.; Solórzano, Andrés; Langer, Max C. (2015), "The last marine pelomedusoids (Testudines: Pleurodira): a new species of Bairdemys and the paleoecology of Stereogenyina" (PDF), PeerJ, 3 e1063, Bibcode:2015PeerJ...3e1063F, doi:10.7717/peerj.1063, PMC 4493680, PMID 26157628
- Penín Cendón, José Antonio; Villarroel Estaba, Vanessa Ilia (2005), Integracrón y actualización geológica del área de Jacura y Capadare, Estado Falcón (PDF), Universidad Central de Venezuela, pp. 1–199

Castillo Formation

- Johnson, Kenneth G.; Sánchez Villagra, Marcelo R.; Aguilera, Órangel A. (2009), "The Oligocene-Miocene transition on coral reefs in the Falcón Basin (NW Venezuela)", PALAIOS, 24 (1): 59–69, Bibcode:2009Palai..24...59J, CiteSeerX 10.1.1.617.9079, doi:10.2110/palo.2008.p08-004r
- Rincón, Ascanio D.; Solórzano, Andrés; McDonald, H. Gregory; Núñez Flores, Mónica (2017), "Baraguatherium takumara, gen. et sp. nov., the earliest mylodontoid sloth (early Miocene) from northern South America", Journal of Mammalian Evolution, 24 (2): 179–191, doi:10.1007/s10914-016-9328-y
- Rincón, Ascanio D.; Solórzano, Andrés; Benammi, Mouloud; Vignaud, Patrick; McDonald, H. Gregory (2014), "Chronology and geology of an Early Miocene mammalian assemblage in North of South America, from Cerro La Cruz (Castillo Formation), Lara State, Venezuela: implications in the 'changing course of Orinoco River' hypothesis" (PDF), Andean Geology, 41: 507–528
- Solórzano, Andrés; Rincón, Ascanio D.; Cidade, Giovanne M.; Núñez Flores, Mónica; Sánchez, Leonardo (2019), "Lower Miocene alligatoroids (Crocodylia) from the Castillo Formation, northwest of Venezuela" (PDF), Palaeobiodiversity and Palaeoenvironments, 99 (2): 241–259, Bibcode:2019PdPe...99..241S, doi:10.1007/s12549-018-0332-5
- Urbani, Franco; Mendi, David (2010), "Notas sobre la discordancia del margen sur de la cuenca Oligo-Miocena de Falcón estados Lara, Falcón y Yaracuy, Venezuela", Boletín de la Academia de Ciencias Físicas, Matemáticas y Naturales, LXX: 9–25

Mesa Formation

- Granadino A., Maybelle N (2012), Evaluación hidrogeológica-geofísica de las formaciones Mesa y Las Piedras aflorantes en Santa Clara, Estado Anzoátegui (BS thesis) (PDF), Universidad Central de Venezuela, pp. 1–126

Río Yuca Formation

- Rincón, Ascanio D.; Solórzano, Andrés; Macsotay, Oliver; McDonald, H. Gregory; Nüñez Flores, Mónica (2016), "A new Miocene vertebrate assemblage from the Río Yuca Formation (Venezuela) and the northernmost record of typical Miocene mammals of high latitude (Patagonian) affinities in South America", Geobios, 757 (5): 1–35, Bibcode:2016Geobi..49..395R, doi:10.1016/j.geobios.2016.06.005

San Gregorio Formation

- Carlini, Alfredo A.; Brandoni, Diego; Sánchez, Rodolfo; Sánchez Villagra, Marcelo R. (2018), "A new Megatheriinae skull (Xenarthra, Tardigrada) from the Pliocene of Northern Venezuela – implications for a giant sloth dispersal to Central and North America", Palaeontologia Electronica, 21 (2): Article number, Bibcode:2018PalEl..21..771C, doi:10.26879/771, hdl:11336/80208
- Castro, Mariela C.; Carlini, Alfredo A.; Sánchez, Rodolfo; Sánchez Villagra, Marcelo R. (2014), "A new Dasypodini armadillo (Xenarthra: Cingulata) from San Gregorio Formation, Pliocene of Venezuela: affinities and biogeographic interpretations", Naturwissenschaften, . (2): 1–10, Bibcode:2014NW....101...77C, CiteSeerX 10.1.1.721.1471, doi:10.1007/s00114-013-1131-5, PMID 24414134

Santa Inés Formation

- Simpson, George Gaylord (1947), "A Miocene glyptodont from Venezuela", American Museum Novitates (1368): 1–10, CiteSeerX 10.1.1.866.6506

Urumaco, Socorro & Codore Formations

- Carrillo Briceño, Jorge D.; Maxwell, Erin; Aguilera, Órangel A.; Sánchez, Rodolfo; Sánchez Villagra, Marcelo R. (2015), "Sawfishes and Other Elasmobranch Assemblages from the Mio-Pliocene of the South Caribbean (Urumaco Sequence, Northwestern Venezuela)", PLoS ONE, 10 (10) e0139230, Bibcode:2015PLoSO..1039230C, doi:10.1371/journal.pone.0139230, PMC 4619466, PMID 26488163
- Linares, Omar J (2004), "Bioestratigrafía de la fauna de mamíferos de las formaciones Socorro, Urumaco y Codore (Mioceno Medio-Plioceno Temprano) de la región de Urumaco, Falcón, Venezuela" (PDF), Paleobiología Neotropical, 1: 1–26
- Quijano Ballesteros, Jhon Richard (2005), Estudio magnetoestratigráfico en la sección de El Mamón (miembro medio de la Formación Urumaco, Estado Falcón) (MSc. thesis) (PDF), Universidad Simón Bolívar, pp. 1–92
- Rincón, Ascanio D.; Solórzano, Andrés; McDonald, H. Gregory; Montellano Ballesteros, Marisol (2018), "Two new megalonychid sloths (Mammalia: Xenarthra) from the Urumaco Formation (late Miocene), and their phylogenetic affinities", Journal of Systematic Palaeontology, 17 (5): 409–421, doi:10.1080/14772019.2018.1427639
- Rincón, Ascanio D.; McDonald, H. Gregory; Solórzano, Andrés; Núñez Flores, Mónica; Ruiz Ramoni, Damián (2015), "A new enigmatic Late Miocene mylodontoid sloth from northern South America", Royal Society Open Science, 2 (2) 140256, Bibcode:2015RSOS....240256R, doi:10.1098/rsos.140256, PMC 4448802, PMID 26064594
