= Huayquerian =

Period of geologic time (9.0–6.8 Ma)

The Huayquerian (Spanish: Huayqueriense) age is a period of geologic time (9.0–6.8 Ma) within the Late Miocene epoch of the Neogene, used more specifically within the SALMA classification. It follows the Chasicoan and precedes the Montehermosan age.

== Etymology ==
The age is named after the Huayquerías Formation in the western Cuyo Basin of northwestern Argentina that was later dated to the Montehermosan. The most complete Huayquerian fauna is found in the Cerro Azul Formation, in Buenos Aires Province also referred to as Epecuén Formation.

== Formations ==
Locations of Huayquerian formations

Formation bold is type	Country	Basin	Notes
Huayquerías Formation	Argentina	Cuyo Basin	
Andalhuala Formation	Argentina	Santa María-Hualfín Basin	
Bahía Inglesa Formation - Cerro Ballena	Chile	Caldera Basin	
Camacho Formation	Uruguay	Norte & Santa Lucía Basins	
Cerro Azul Formation	Argentina	Colorado Basin	
Chiquimil Formation	Argentina	Santa María-Hualfín Basin	
Coquimbo Formation	Chile	Tongoy Bay	
Las Flores Formation	Argentina	Sierra del Tontal	
Entrerriana Formation	Argentina	Chaco Basin	(Note: Former name of Ituzaingó Formation)
Epecuén Formation	Argentina	Claromecó Basin	(Note: Former name of Cerro Azul Formation)
Içá Formation	Brazil	Madre de Deus Basin	
Iñapari Formation	Peru	Madre de Dios Basin	
India Muerta Formation	Argentina	Sierras Pampeanas	
Ituzaingó Formation	Argentina	Paraná Basin	
Kiyu Formation	Uruguay	Santa Lucía Basin	(Note: In later research considered part of the Camacho Formation)
Madre de Dios Formation	Peru	Madre de Dios Basin	
Maimará Formation	Argentina	Eastern Argentinian Andes	
Mauri Formation	Bolivia	Altiplano Basin	
Miramar Formation	Peru	Sechura Basin	
El Morterito Formation	Argentina	Cajón Valley	
Muyu Huasi Formation	Bolivia	Muyu Huasi Basin	
Navidad Formation	Chile	Chilean Coast Range	
Palo Pintado Formation	Argentina	Salta Basin	
Paraná Formation	Argentina	Chaco Basin	
Pebas Formation	Brazil; Colombia; Ecuador; Peru	Amazon Basin	
Piquete Formation	Argentina	Salta Basin	
Pisco Formation	Peru	Pisco Basin	
Quehua Formation	Bolivia	Altiplano Basin	
Raigón Formation	Uruguay	Norte Basin	
Rosa Pata Formation	Bolivia	Altiplano Basin	
Saldungaray Formation	Argentina	Buenos Aires Province	
Salicas Formation	Argentina	Sierra de Velasco	
Solimões Formation	Brazil	Solimões Basin	
Urumaco Formation	Venezuela	Falcón Basin	

== Fossil content ==
Group	Fossils	Formation	Notes
Mammals	Cyonasua pascuali, Huayqueriana cristata	Huayquerías	
Mammals	Australophoca changorum, Brachydelphis jahuayensis, Thalassocnus natans, Acrophoca sp., Balaenoptera sp., ?Nanosiren sp., Odobenocetops sp., Piscophoca sp., Pliopontos sp., Pontistes sp., Balaenopteridae indet., Delphinoidea indet., Istiophoridae indet., Kogiidae indet., Monachinae indet., Odontoceti indet., Phocidae indet., Phocoenidae indet., Physeteroidea indet., Xiphiidae indet.	Bahía; Inglesa	
Mammals	Arazamys castiglionii, Kiyumylodon lecuonai, Kraglievichia paranense, Lestobradys sprechmanni, Neoglyptatelus uruguayensis, Pseudoplohophorus absolutus, Euphractini indet.	Camacho	
Mammals	Hyperdidelphys pattersoni, Microtragulus rusconii, Neocavia pampeana, Palaeoctodon aff. simplicidens, Pampamys emmonsae, Pliolestes venetus, Reigechimys plesiodon, R. simplex, Thylacosmilus atrox, Thylamys pinei, Thylatheridium dolgopolae, T. hudsoni, Zygolestes tatei, Eumysops sp., Sparassocynidae indet.	Cerro; Azul	
Mammals	Eosclerocalyptus planus, Orthomyctera andina, ?Palaeocavia mawka, Cardiomys sp., Chasicotatus sp., Chorobates sp., Diadiaphorus sp., Gyriabrus sp., Lagostomus (Lagostomopsis) sp., Paedotherium sp., Paleuphractus sp., Paranamys sp., Potamarchus sp., Proscelidodon sp., Protabrocoma sp., Stromaphorus sp., Tetrastylus sp., Typotheriopsis sp., Vassallia sp., Vetelia sp., Xotodon sp.	Chiquimil	
Mammals	Balaena dubia, Notictis ortizi, Ischyrorhynchus vanbenedeni, Otaria fischeri, Palaeobalaena bergi, P. dubia, Phugatherium cataclisticum, Pontistes rectifrons, Pontivaga fischeri, Ribodon limbatus, Saurocetes argentinus, Stylocynus paranensis, Toxodon paranensis, Chironectes sp.	Entrerriana	
Mammals	Aspidocalyptus castroi, Borhyaenidium musteloides, Chorobates villosissimus, Coscinocercus brachyurus, C. marcalaini, Cyonasua brevirostris, C. prebrevirostris, Doellotatus chapadmalensis, Elassotherium altirostre, Eoauchenia cingulata, Epecuenia thoatherioides, Hemihegetotherium lazai, Macrauchenia sp., Macrochorobates scalabrinii, Macroeuphractus morenoi, Paedotherium minor, Phtoramys hidalguense, Pisanodon nazari, Plohophorus araucanus, Pseudotypotherium carhuense, Tetrastylus araucanus, Thylacosmilus atrox, Thylatheridium dolgopolae, T. hudsoni, Cardiomys sp., Eosclerocalyptus sp., Lagostomus sp., Lutreolina sp., Orthomyctera sp., Palaeocavia sp., Paleuphractus sp., Plesiomegatherium sp., Proeuphractus sp., Promacrauchenia sp., Thylamys sp., Hydrochoeridae indet.	Epecuén	
Mammals	Cardiatherium calingastaense	Las Flores	
Mammals	Amazonycteris divisus	Içá	
Mammals	Mionothropus cartellei	Iñapari	
Mammals	"Microtragulus ameghino"	India; Muerta	
Mammals	?Adinotherium paranense, Amphiocnus paranense, Brachytherium cuspidatum, Cardiatherium paranense, Chasicotatus spinozai, Chlamyphractus pressulus, Comaphorus concisus, Cyonasua argentina, Dasypus neogaeus, Diadiaphorus paranensis, Dilobodon lutarius, Dinotoxodon paranensis, Eleutherocercus paranensis, Eomegatherium nanum, Eumysops parodii, Eutomodus elautus, Haplodontherium limun, Hoplophorus verus, Kraglievichia paranense, Macroeuphractus retusus, Megabradys darwini, Megalonychops primigenius, Mesopotamocnus brevirostrum, Munyizia paranensis, Neobrachytherium ameghinoi, Neobrachytherium mesopotamiense, Neoepiblema ambrosettianus, N. horridula, Neohapalops rothi, Notictis ortizi, Octomylodon aversus, Ortotherium laticurvatum, O. robustum, Oxyodontherium piramydatus, O. zeballosi, Pachynodon modicus, Palaehoplophorus antiquus, Palaeotoxodon paranensis, ?P. protoburmeisteri, ?P. virgatus, Paraglyptodon paranensis, Parahoplophorus paranensis, Paranabradys vucetichae, Paranauchenia denticulata, Philander entrerianus, Phoberomys burmeisteri, P. insolita, P. lozanoi, P. minima, P. praecursor, Phugatherium cataclisticum, Pliomegatherium lelongi, Pliomorphus mutilatus, P. paranensis, P. robustus, Proeuphractus limpidus, Prolestodon antiquus, P. paranensis, Promacrauchenia antiqua, Promegatherium parvulum, P. smaltatum, Promylodon paranensis, Pronothrotherium mirabilis, Protoglyptodon primiformis, Protomegalonyx doellojuradoi, P. praecursor, Proterotherium cervioides, Protypotherium antiquum, Pseudoeuryurus lelongianus, Ranculcus scalabrinianus, Saurocetes gigas, Scalabrinitherium bravardi, S. rothii, Scirrotherium carinatum, Sphenotherus paranensis, Stenotephanos plicidens, Strabosodon acuticavus, S. obtusicavus, Stylocynus paranensis, Thylacosmilus atrox, Torcellia paranense, Toxodontherium compressum, T. reverendum, ?Trachycalyptus cingulatus, Urotherium interundatum, Xotodon doellojuradi, Xotodon foricurvatus, Zygolestes paranensis, Anatochoerus sp., ?Berroia sp., Berthawyleria sp., Briaromys sp., Cardiomys sp., Carlesia sp., Caviodon sp., Chironectes sp., Colpostemma sp., Contracavia sp., Cullinia levis, Diaphoromys sp., Doellomys sp., Drytomomys sp., Eumegamys sp., Eumegamysops sp., Gyriabrus sp., Haplostropha sp., Isostylomys sp., Lagostomus (Lagostomopsis) sp., Myocastor sp., Palaeocavia sp., Paradoxomys sp., Paranamys sp., Parodimys sp., Pentastylomys sp., Pliodolichotis sp., Potamarchus sp., Prodolichotis sp., Protabrocoma sp., Protomegamys sp., Pseudosigmomys sp., Pyramiodontherium sp., Strophostephanos sp., Tetrastylus sp., Trachytypotherium sp., ?Zaedyus sp., Iniidae indet., Scelidotheriinae indet.	Ituzaingó	
Mammals	Proeuphractus limpidus	Kiyu	(Note: In later research considered part of the Camacho Formation)
Mammals	Noctilio lacrimaelunaris, Surameryx acrensis, Sylvochoerus woodburnei, Waldochoerus bassleri	Madre de Dios	
Mammals	Proscelidodon patrius, Sparassocynus maimarai, Xotodon maimarensis	Maimará	
Mammals	Borhyaenidium altiplanicus, Hoffstetterius imperator, Mcdonaldocnus villarroeli Trachycalyptoides achirense, Dasypodidae indet., Hegetotheriidae indet., Lagostominae indet., Mesotheriidae indet., Nothrotheriinae indet., Sclerocalyptinae indet., Toxodontidae indet.	Mauri	
Mammals	Balaenopteridae indet.	Miramar	
Mammals	Calchaquitherium mixtum	El Morterito	
Mammals	?Cardiomys sp., cf. Doellotatus sp., Lagostomus (Lagostomopsis) sp., ?Orthomyctera sp., cf. Paleuphractus sp., Protabrocoma sp., Protypotherium sp., Pseudohegetotherium sp., cf. Sciamys sp., Dinomyidae indet., Erethizontidae indet., Mylodontidae indet., Proterotheriidae indet.	Muyu; Huasi	
Mammals	Paedotherium kakai	Palo; Pintado	
Mammals	Dioplotherium sp., Metaxytherium sp.	Paraná	
Mammals	Koristocetus pescei, Tiucetus rosae	Pisco	
Mammals	Cranithlastus xibiensis, Megatheriinae indet.	Piquete	
Mammals	Microtypotherium cf. choquecotense, Plesiotypotherium cf. achirense, P. cf. majus, P. minus, Orthomyctera sp., Dasypodidae indet.	Quehua	
Mammals	Pronothrotherium figueirasi, P. mirabilis	Raigón	
Mammals	Pseudotypotherium sp., Dasypodidae indet., Glyptodontidae indet., ?Macraucheniidae indet.	Rosa Pata	
Mammals	Chasicotatus ameghinoi, C. cf. peiranoi, Chorobates villosissimus, Doellotatus cf. inornatus, D. cf. praecursor, Macroeuphractus cf. morenoi, Neophanomys biplicatus, Paedotherium bonaerense, P. cf. minor, Phtoramys cf. hidalguense, P. homogenidens, Ringueletia simpsoni, Tremacyllus cf. impressus, Xenodontomys ellipticus, Acantharodeia sp., Aspidocalyptus sp., Berthawyleria sp., cf. Borhyaenidium sp., Dolicavia sp., Lagostomus sp., Neocavia sp., Palaeocavia sp., Promacrauchenia sp., Caviidae indet., Dasypodidae indet.	Saldungaray	
Mammals	Eosclerocalyptus planus, Hemihegetotherium cf. torresi, Lagostomus cf. pretrichodactyla, Macrochorobates scalabrinii, Neophanomys biplicatus, Orthomyctera andina, Paedotherium minor, Proeuphractus limpidus, Acantharodeia sp., cf. Cardiomys sp., Chaetophractus sp., Chasicotatus sp., Lagostomus sp., Neobrachytherium sp., Potamarchus sp., Protypotherium sp., Pseudotypotherium sp., cf. Tremacyllus sp., Hoplophorini indet., Octodontidae indet.	Salicas	
Mammals	Abothrodon pricei, Acarechimys hunikuini, Acrecebus fraileyi, Amahuacatherium peruvium, Didelphis solimoensis, Eumegamys paranensis, Ferigolomys pacarana, Gyrinodon quasus, Ischyrorhynchus vanbenedeni, Lutreolina materdei, Mesenodon juruaensis, Mesotoxodon pricei, Minitoxodon acrensis, Neoepiblema ambrosettianus, N. horridula, Neotoxodon pascuali, Neotrigodon utoquineae, Noctilio lacrimaelunaris, Octodontobradys puruensis, Phoberomys bordasi, P. burmeisteri, P. minima, Plesiotoxodon amazonensis, Plicodontinia mourai, cf. Pomatodelphis bobengi, Potamarchus adamiae, P. murinus, P. sigmodon, Pseudoprepotherium venezuelanum, Purperia cribatidens, Ribodon limbatus, Scirrotherium carinatum, Scleromys colombianus, Solimoea acrensis, Stenodon campbelli, Telicomys amazonensis, Toxodontherium listai, Trigodonops lopesi, Urumacotherium campbelli, Xenastrapotherium amazonense, Anadasypus sp., Asterostemma depressa, Boreostemma pliocena, Cardiatherium sp., Cullinia levis, Gyriabrus sp., Hapalops indifferens, Kraglievichia paranense, Neoglyptatelus originalis, Palaeotoxodon sp., Paraglyptodon sp., Paratrigodon sp., cf. Planops sp., Pliomorphus sp., Plohophorus paranensis, cf. Protomegalonyx sp., Proterotherium cervioides, Pseudoprepotherium sp., Ranculcus sp., Saurocetes gigas, Simplimus sp., Stirtonia tatacoensis , Tetrastylus sp., Trigodon gaudryi, Urumacotherium campbelli, Cardiomyinae indet., Dasyproctidae indet., Erethizontidae indet., Heteropsomyinae indet., Macraucheniidae indet., Marsupialia indet., Megalonychidae indet., Molossidae indet., Mylodontidae indet., Neoepiblemidae indet., Pampatheriinae indet., Pontoporiidae indet., Toxodontidae indet.	Solimões	
Mammals	Ullumys pattoni	Las Tapias	
Mammals	Eionaletherium tanycnemius, Lestodon urumaquensis, Phoberomys pattersoni, Pattersonocnus diazgameroi, Urumacocnus urbanii, Cardiatherium sp., Eumegamys sp., Hemihegetotherium sp., Ocnerotherium sp., Ribodon sp., Tetrastylus sp.	Urumaco	
Birds	Argentavis magnificens	Andalhualá	
Birds	Pelagornis chilensis, Spheniscidae indet.	Bahía Inglesa	
Birds	Argentavis magnificens, Eudromia sp.	Epecuén	
Birds	Andalgalornis sp., Devincenzia sp., Megapaloelodus sp., Phoenicopteridae indet., Phorusrhacidae indet., Rallidae indet., Rheidae indet.	Ituzaingó	
Birds	Anhinga fraileyi, A. cf. grandis, A. minuta, Phorusrhacinae indet.	Solimões	
Reptiles	Caiman australis, C. paranensis, C. praecursor, Leptorramphus entrerrianus, Rhamphostomopsis neogaeus, Testudines indet.	Entrerriana	
Reptiles	Caiman australis, C. gasparinae, C. jacare, C. latirostris, C. lutescens, C. cf. yacare, Gryposuchus neogaeus, Mourasuchus arendsi, Parahydraspis paranaensis, Phrynops cf. geoffroanus, Tupinambis cf. merianae	Ituzaingó	
Reptiles	Chelonioidea indet., Crocodylia indet., Eusuchia indet.	Miramar	
Reptiles	Caiman cf. latirostris	Palo; Pintado	
Reptiles	Acresuchus pachytemporalis, Caiman brevirostris, C. niteroensis, Charactosuchus fieldsi, C. mendesi, C. sansoai, Chelus colombianus, Chelus lewisi, Colombophis portai, C. spinosus, Gryposuchus jessei, Melanosuchus latrubessei, Mourasuchus amazonensis, M. arendsi, Podocnemis bassieri, Podocnemis negrii, Purussaurus brasiliensis, Chelonoidis sp., aff. Epicrates sp., Eunectes sp., Hesperogavialis bocquentini?, cf. Paradracaena sp., Stupendemys souzai, Waincophis sp., Brachygnathosuchus braziliensis, Colubridae indet., ?Gavialosuchus sp., Pelomedusidae indet., Serpentes indet., Testudinidae indet.	Solimões	
Reptiles	Melanosuchus fisheri, Mourasuchus pattersoni, Stupendemys geographicus	Urumaco	
Fishes	Carcharodon carcharias, C. hastalis, Cosmopolitodus hastalis	Bahía Inglesa	
Fishes	Megalodon, Carcharhinus egertoni, Carcharodon hastalis, Carcharias sp., Myliobatis sp.	Camacho	
Fishes	Lamna amplibasidens, L. serridens, L. unicuspidens, Myliobatis americanus, Odontaspis macrota, Osteophorus typus, Sargus incertus, Silurus agassizii, Sparus antiquus, Squalus eocenus, Squalus obliquidens, Solea sp.	Entrerriana	
Fishes	Colossoma macropomus, Megapiranha paranensis, Cynodontidae indet.	Ituzaingó	
Fishes	Megalodon, Carcharhinus brachyurus, Carcharhinus falciformis, Carcharhinus leucas, Carcharias taurus, Galeocerdo aduncus, Ginglymostoma cirratum, Hemipristis serra, Negaprion brevirostris, Sphyrna lewini, Sphyrna zygaena, Aetobatus sp., Dasyatis sp., Myliobatis sp.	Miramar	
Fishes	Megalodon, Carcharias taurus, Carcharhinus sp., Carcharodon plicatilis, Galeocerdo aduncus, Hemipristis serra, Megascyliorhinus trelewensis, Dasyatis sp., Heterodontus sp., Sphyrna sp., Squatina sp., Ariidae indet., Holocephali indet., Rajidae indet., Sciaenidae indet., Sparidae indet.	Paraná	
Fishes	Acregoliath rancii, Colossoma macropomum, Callichthyidae indet., Doradidae indet., Osteoglossidae indet., Phractocephalus acreornatus, Pimelodidae indet., Potamotrygonidae indet.	Solimões	
Decapods	Homarus meridionalis	Entrerriana	
Flora	Alnipollenites verus, Annulispora folliculosa, Arecipites asymmetricus, Baculatisporites comaumensis, Biretisporites potoniaei, Chenopodipollis chenopodiaceoides, C. multicavus, Cricotriporites guianensis, Cyathidites congoensis, C. minor, Cyperaceaepollis neogenicus, Deltoidospora minor, Dictyophyllidites arcuatus, D. chiquimilense, D. mortoni, Echiperiporites parviechinatus, Equisetosporites claricristatus, E. lusaticus, E. notensis, Foveotriletes microfoveolatus, Gleicheniidites senonicus, Graminidites media, Haloragacidites trioratus, Laevigatosporites ovatus, Leiotriletes regularis, Leptolepidites major, Liliacidites vermireticulatus, Malvacipollis argentina, Muricingulisporis verrucosus, Nothofagidites saraensis, Osmundacidites ciliatus, Palaeocoprosmadites zelandiae, Parsonsidites multiporus, Periporopollenites vesicus, Plicifera delicata, Podocarpidites ellipticus, P. exiguus, P. marwickii, Polycolporopollenites esobalteus, Polypodiaceoisporites simplex, P. tumulatus, Polypodiisporites speciosus, Psilamonocolpites grandis, Psilaperiporites minimus, Psilatricolporites cyamus, Reticuloidosporites tenellis, Rhoipites alveolatus, R. baculatus, R. cienaguensis, R. exiguus, R. karamuensis, R. santafesii, Rugulatisporites caperatus, Sparganiaceaepollenites delicata, Stereisporites antiquasporites, Striatricolporites gamerroi, Tetracolporopollenites megadolium, Todisporites major, T. minor, Tricolpites reticulatus, Triorites orbiculatus, Tuberculatosporites parvus, Tubulifloridites antipodica, Verrustephanoporites simplex, Gomphrenipollis sp., Klukisporites sp., Margocolporites sp., Myrtaceidites sp., Perfotricolpites sp., Reticulatisporites sp., Retistephanocolpites sp., Undulatisporites sp., Verrucingulatisporites sp.	Chiquimil	
Flora	Acrostichum palaeoaureum, Blechnum serrulatiformis, Cabomba aff. caroliniana, Caesalpinia aff. stuckerti, Cedrela fissiliformis, Ficus tressensii, Lycopodiella aff. cernua, Mayaca aff. fluviatilis, Ranunculodendron anzoteguiae, Sapium haematospermoides, Schinus herbstii, Equisetum sp.	Palo; Pintado	

== Correlations ==
Huayquerian correlations in South America
Formation	Cerro Azul	Ituzaingó	Paraná	Camacho	Raigón	Andalhuala	Chiquimil	Las Flores	Maimará	Palo	Pebas	Muyu	Rosa	Saldungaray	Salicas	Urumaco	Map
Basin	Colorado	Paraná				Hualfín		Tontal	Andes	Salta	Amazon	Huasi	Altiplano	BA	Velasco	Falcón	Huayquerian (South America)
Country	Argentina			Uruguay		Argentina					Brazil Peru	Bolivia		Argentina		Venezuela	Huayquerian (South America)
Cardiatherium																	Huayquerian (South America)
Lagostomus																	Huayquerian (South America)
Macroeuphractus																	Huayquerian (South America)
Proeuphractus																	Huayquerian (South America)
Pronothrotherium																	Huayquerian (South America)
Pseudotypotherium																	Huayquerian (South America)
Thylacosmilus																	Huayquerian (South America)
Xotodon																	Huayquerian (South America)
Macraucheniidae																	Huayquerian (South America)
Primates																	Huayquerian (South America)
Rodents																	Huayquerian (South America)
Reptiles																	Huayquerian (South America)
Birds																	Huayquerian (South America)
Terror birds																	Huayquerian (South America)
Flora																	Huayquerian (South America)
Environments	Aeolian-fluvial	Fluvio-deltaic			Fluvial						Fluvio-lacustrine	Fluvial			Fluvio-lacustrine	Fluvio-deltaic	Huayquerian volcanoclastics Huayquerian fauna Huayquerian flora
Volcanic						Yes											Huayquerian volcanoclastics Huayquerian fauna Huayquerian flora

== Notes and references ==
=== Bibliography ===
Huayquerías Formation

- Forasiepi, Analía M.; MacPhee, Ross D.E.; Hernández del Pino, Santiago; Schmidt, Gabriela I.; Amson, Eli; Grohé, Camille (2016), "Exceptional skull of Huayqueriana (Mammalia, Litopterna, Macraucheniidae) from the Late Miocene of Argentina: anatomy, systematics and paleobiological implications" (PDF), Bulletin of the American Museum of Natural History, 404: 1–76, doi:10.1206/0003-0090-404.1.1
- Garrido, Alberto C.; Bonini, Ricardo; Barbeau, David L. (2017), Paleoambiente, edad y vertebrados de la Formación Huayquerías, Mioceno tardio, Provincia de Mendoza, Republica Argentina, XX Congreso Geológico Argentino, pp. 50–55

Andalhuala Formation

- Candela, Adriana M.; Bonini, Ricardo A. (2017), "A new guinea pig (Rodentia, Caviomorpha) from northwestern Argentina: Implications for the origin of the genus Cavia", Journal of Vertebrate Paleontology, 37 (4) e1352591, Bibcode:2017JVPal..37E2591C, doi:10.1080/02724634.2017.1352591, hdl:11336/58708

Camacho Formation

- Fernicola, Juan C.; Rinderknecht, Andrés; Jones, Washington; Vizcaíno, Sergio F.; Propino, Kleberson (2018), "A new species of Neoglyptatelus (Mammalia, Xenarthra, Cingulata) from the late Miocene of Uruguay provides new insights on the evolution of the dorsal armor in cingulates", Ameghiniana, 55 (3): 233–252, doi:10.5710/AMGH.02.12.2017.3150, hdl:11336/96801
- Rinderknecht, Andrés (2011), Estudio sobre los roedores gigantes del Uruguay, Departamento de San José (Mioceno tardío-Pliocene) y sus implicancias para la sistemática y taxonomía de la familia Dinomyidae (Mammalia, Rodentia) (PDF), Universidad de la República, pp. 1–101, archived from the original (PDF) on 2018-10-02
- Verde, Mariano (2002), Icnología de la formación Camacho (Mioceno tardío) del Uruguay (MSc. thesis) (PDF), Universidad de la República, pp. 1–125

Cerro Azul Formation

- Goin, F.J.; Montalvo, C.; Visconti, G. (2000), "Los marsupiales (Mammalia) del Mioceno superior de la Formación Cerro Azul (Provincia de La Pampa, Argentina)", Estudios Geológicos, 56 (1–2): 101–126, Bibcode:2000EstGM..56..101G, doi:10.3989/egeol.00561-2158, hdl:11336/108700
- Madozzo Jaén, M. Carolina; Pérez, M. Encarnación; Montalvo, Claudia I.; Tomassini, Rodrigo L. (2018), "Systematic review of Neocavia from the Neogene of Argentina: Phylogenetic and evolutionary implications" (PDF), Acta Palaeontologica Polonica, 63 (2): 241–260
- Sostillo, Renata; Montalvo, Claudia I.; Verzi, Diego H. (2014), "A new species of Reigechimys (Rodentia, Echimyidae) from the Late Miocene of central Argentina and the evolutionary pattern of the lineage", Ameghiniana, 51 (4): 284–294, Bibcode:2014Amegh..51..284S, doi:10.5710/AMGH.24.04.2014.2741, hdl:11336/9150

Chiquimil Formation

- Esteban, G.; Nasif, N.; Georgieff, S.M. (2014), "Cronobioestratigrafía del Mioceno tardío – Plioceno temprano, Puerta de Corral Quemado y Villavil, provincia de Catamarca, Argentina" (PDF), Acta Geológica Lilloana, 26: 165–192
- Madozzo Jaén, María Carolina; Pérez, María Encarnación (2017), "The most ancient caviine rodent (Hystricognathi, Cavioidea) comes from the late Miocene of Northwest Argentina (South America)", Historical Biology: An International Journal of Paleobiology, 29 (3): 376–383, Bibcode:2017HBio...29..376M, doi:10.1080/08912963.2016.1166360, hdl:11336/61885
- Martínez, Leandro C.A.; Lutz, Alicia I. (2004), Estudios preliminares de la xiloflora de la Formación Chiquimil (Catamarca) (PDF), Universidad Nacional del Nordeste - Comunicaciones Científicas y Tecnológicas, pp. 1–3, archived from the original (PDF) on 2018-05-21
- Mautino, Lilia R.; Anzótegui, Luisa M., Polen de la Formación Chiquimil, en la Localidad Vallecito (Mioceno Superior) Provincia de Catamarca (PDF), Universidad Nacional del Nordeste, pp. 1–3, archived from the original (PDF) on 2018-05-21
- Morton, L.S.; Herbst, R., Gastrópodos (Orthalicidae) de la Formación Chiquimil (Mioceno) de Villavil, Provincia de Catamarca, Argentina (PDF), Universidad Nacional del Nordeste, pp. 1–3, archived from the original (PDF) on May 21, 2018

Las Flores Formation, Sierra del Tontal

- Cerdeño, Esperanza; Pérez, María E.; Deschamps, Cecilia M.; Contreras, Víctor H. (2019), "A new capybara from the late Miocene of San Juan Province, Argentina, and its phylogenetic implications" (PDF), Acta Palaeontologica Polonica, 64: 1–14

Içá Formation

- Czaplewski, Nicholas J.; Campbell, Jr., Kenneth E. (2017), "Late Miocene Bats from the Jurua River, State of Acre, Brazil, with a Description of a New Genus of Thyropteridae (Chiroptera, Mammalia)" (PDF), Contributions in Science, 525: 55–60, doi:10.5962/p.318347, archived from the original (PDF) on 2017-07-25

Iñapari Formation

- Frailey, Carl D (1986), "Late Miocene and Holocene mammals, exclusive of the Notoungulata, of the Rio Acre Region, western Amazonia" (PDF), Contributions in Science, 374: 1–46, doi:10.5962/p.208117, archived from the original (PDF) on 2016-06-29
- De Iullis, Gerardo; Gaudin, Timothy J.; Vicars, Matthew J. (2011), "A new genus and species of nothrotheriid sloth (Xenarthra, Tardigrada, Nothrotheriidae) from the Late Miocene (Huayquerian) of Peru", Palaeontology, 54 (1): 171–205, Bibcode:2011Palgy..54..171D, doi:10.1111/j.1475-4983.2010.01001.x

India Muerta Formation

- García López, Daniel A.; Barbot, M. Judith (2015), "A late Miocene Argyrolagidae (Mammalia, Metatheria, Bonapartheriiformes) from northwestern Argentina", Ameghiniana, 52 (3): 314–323, Bibcode:2015Amegh..52..314G, doi:10.5710/AMGH.17.02.2015.2876, hdl:11336/50746

Ituzaingó Formation

- Brandoni, Diego (2014), "A new genus of Megalonychidae (Mammalia, Xenarthra) from the Late Miocene of Argentina", Revista Brasileira de Paleontologia, 17 (1): 33–42, Bibcode:2014RvBrP..17...33B, doi:10.4072/rbp.2014.1.04, hdl:11336/18955
- Franco, María Jimena; Brea, Mariana; Orfeo, Óscar; Zucol, Alejandro F. (2013), "La paleoflora de la Formación Ituzaingó, Argentina" (PDF), El Neógeno de la Mesopotamia argentina, Asociación Paleontológica Argentina, Publicación Especial, 14: 41–55
- Scillato Yané, Gustavo J.; Góis, Flávio; Zurita, Alfredo E.; Carlini, Alfredo A.; González Ruiz, Laureano R.; Krmpotic, Cecilia M.; Oliva, Cristian; Zamorano, Martín (2013), "Los Cingulata (Mammalia, Xenarthra) del "Conglomerado Osífero" (Miocene tardío) de la Formación Ituzaingó de Entre Ríos, Argentina" (PDF), Revista de la Asociación Paleontológica Argentina Publicación Especial, 14: 118–134

Madre de Dios Formation

- Frailey, Carl David; Campbell Jr., Kenneth E. (2012), "Two New Genera of Peccaries (Mammalia, Artiodactyla, Tayassuidae) from Upper Miocene Deposits of the Amazon Basin", Journal of Paleontology, 86 (5): 852–877, Bibcode:2012JPal...86..852F, doi:10.1666/12-012.1
- Prothero, Donald R.; Campbell, Jr, Kenneth E.; Beatty, Brian L.; Frailey, Carl D. (2014), "New late Miocene dromomerycine artiodactyl from the Amazon Basin: implications for interchange dynamics", Journal of Paleontology, 88 (3): 434–443, doi:10.1666/13-022
- Romero P., Lidia; Morales R., María del Carmen; Carpio R, Mario (1998), Geología de los cuadrángulos de Río Acre 22-v, Iñapari 22-x, Qda. Mala 23-v, Iberia 23-x, San Lorenzo 23-y, Puerto Lidia 24-v, Río Manuripe 24-x, Mavila 24-y, Santa María 24-z, Valencia 25-z, Palma Real 26-z y Río Heath 27-z (PDF), INGEMMET, pp. 1–201, archived from the original (PDF) on 2019-02-13

Maimará Formation

- Abello, María Alejandra; De los Reyes, Martín; Candela, Adriana Magdalena; Pujos, François; Voglino, Damián; Mamani Quispe, Bernardino (2015), "Description of a new species of Sparassocynus (Marsupialia: Didelphoidea: Sparassocynidae) from the late Miocene of Jujuy (Argentina) and taxonomic review of Sparassocynus heterotopicus from the Pliocene of Bolivia", Zootaxa, 3937 (1): 147–160, doi:10.11646/zootaxa.3937.1.7, hdl:11336/48565, PMID 25947465
- Bonini, Ricardo A.; Schmidt, Gabriela I.; Reguero, Marcelo A.; Cerdeño, Esperanza; Candela, Adriana M.; Solís, Natalia (2017), "First record of Toxodontidae (Mammalia, Notoungulata) from the late Miocene–early Pliocene of the southern central Andes, NW Argentina", Journal of Paleontology, 91 (3): 566–576, Bibcode:2017JPal...91..566B, doi:10.1017/jpa.2016.160, hdl:11336/49805
- Pujos, François; Candela, Adriana; Galli, Claudia I.; Coiras, Beatriz L.; Reguero, Marcelo A.; de los Reyes, Martín; Abello, María Alejandra (2012), "The Scelidotherine Proscelidodon (Xenarthra: Mylodontidae) from the Late Miocene of Maimará (Northwestern Argentina, Jujuy Province)" (PDF), Ameghiniana: 1–7

Mauri & Muyu Huasi Formations

- Marshall, Larry G.; Sempere, Thierry (1991), "The Eocene to Pleistocene vertebrates of Bolivia and their stratigraphic context: A review", Revista técnica de YPFB, 12: 631–652

Miramar Formation

- Isla, Federico; Taglioretti, Matías; Dondas, Alejandro (2015), "Revisión y nuevos aportes sobre la estratigrafía y sedimentología de los acantilados entre Mar de Cobo y Miramar, Provincia de Buenos Aires" (PDF), Revista de la Asociación Geológica Argentina, 72: 235–250

El Morterito Formation

- Morton, Lourdes S.; Herbst, Rafael (2007), "Gastrópodos de la Formación El Morterito (Mioceno Superior), Valle del Cajón, provincia de Catamarca, Argentina", Revista del Museo Argentino de Ciencias Naturales, 9: 153–160, doi:10.22179/REVMACN.9.305

Navidad Formation

- Finger, Kenneth L.; Nielsen, Sven N.; DeVries, Thomas J.; Encinas, Alfonso; Peterson, Dawn E. (2007), "Paleontologic evidence for sedimentary displacement in Neogene forearc basins of central Chile" (PDF), PALAIOS, 22 (1): 3–16, Bibcode:2007Palai..22....3F, doi:10.2110/palo.2005.p05-081r

Palo Pintado Formation

- Anzótegui, Luisa M.; Horn, Maricel Yarina (2011), "Megaflora de la Formación Palo Pintado (Mioceno Superior) Salta, Argentina Parte II" (PDF), Revista Brasileira de Paleontologia, 14 (3): 239–254, Bibcode:2011RvBrP..14..239A, doi:10.4072/rbp.2011.3.04
- Galli, Claudia Inés; Anzótegui, Luisa Matilde; Horn, Maricel Yanina; Morton, Lourdes Susana (2011), "Paleoambiente y paleocomunidades de la Formación Palo Pintado (Mioceno-Plioceno), Provincia de Salta, Argentina" (PDF), Revista Mexicana de Ciencias Geológicas, 28: 161–174, archived from the original (PDF) on 2018-05-21
- Reguero, Marcelo A.; Candela, Adriana M.; Galli, Claudia I.; Bonini, Ricardo; Voglino, Damián (2015), "A new Hypsodont Notoungulate (Hegetotheriidae, Pachyrukhinae) from the late Miocene of the Eastern Cordillera, Salta province, Northwest of Argentina" (PDF), Andean Geology, 42: 56–70, doi:10.5027/andgeoV42n1-a04

Paraná Formation

- Brea, Mariana; Franco, María Jimena; Zucol, Alejandro F. (2013), "Paleoflora de la Formación Paraná (Mioceno Tardío), Cuenca Chaco-Paranaense, Argentina" (PDF), El Neógeno de la Mesopotamia argentina, Asociación Paleontológica Argentina, Publicación Especial, 14: 41–55
- Cione, Alberto Luis; Cabrera, Daniel Alfredo; Barla, María Julia (2012), "Oldest record of the Great White Shark (Lamnidae, Carcharodon; Miocene) in the Southern Atlantic" (PDF), Geobios, 45 (2): 167–172, Bibcode:2012Geobi..45..167C, doi:10.1016/j.geobios.2011.06.002, hdl:11336/139163
- Martín Pérez, Leandro (2013), Sistemática, tafonomía y paleoecología de los invertebrados de la Formación Paraná (Mioceno), Provincia de Entre Ríos, Argentina (PhD thesis) (PDF), Universidad Nacional de La Plata, pp. 1–398

Pebas Formation

- Antoine, Pierre-Olivier; Abello, M. Alejandra; Adnet, Sylvain; Altamirano Sierra, Ali J.; Baby, Patrice; Billet, Guillaume; Boivin, Myriam; Calderón, Ysabel; Candela, Jules Chabain, Fernando Corfu, Darin A. Croft, Morgan Ganerød, Carlos Jaramillo, Sebastian Klaus, Laurent Marivaux, Rosa E. Navarrete, Maëva J. Orliac, Francisco Parra, María Encarnación Pérez, François Pujos, Jean-Claude Rage, Anthony Ravel, Céline Robinet, Martin Roddaz, Julia Victoria Tejada Lara, Jorge Vélez Juarbe, Frank P. Wesselingh, Rodolfo Salas Gismondi, Adriana (2016), "A 60-million-year Cenozoic history of western Amazonian ecosystems in Contamana, eastern Peru", Gondwana Research, 31: 30–59, Bibcode:2016GondR..31...30A, doi:10.1016/j.gr.2015.11.001, hdl:11336/99030
- Wesselingh, F.P.; Hoorn, M.C.; Guerrero, J.; Räsänen, M.E.; Romero Pittmann, L.; Salo, J. (2006), "The stratigraphy and regional structure of Miocene deposits in western Amazonia (Peru, Colombia and Brazil), with implications for late Neogene landscape evolution", Scripta Geologica, 133: 291–322

Piquete Formation

- González Bonorino, Gustavo; Abascal, Liliana del Valle (2012), "Orogénesis y drenaje en la región del Valle de Lerma (Cordillera Oriental, Salta, Argentina) durante Pleistoceno tardio" (PDF), Revista de la Asociación Geológica Argentina, 69: 127–141

Pisco Formation

- Altamirano Sierra, Alí J (2013), "Primer registro de pelicano (Aves: Pelecanidae) para el Mioceno tardio de la formacion Pisco, Peru" (PDF), Bulletin de l'Institut français d'études andines, 42: 1–12
- Báez Gómez, Diego A (2006), "Estudio paleoambiental de la formación Pisco:: Localidad Ocucaje" (PDF), Revista del Instituto de Investigaciones FIGMMG, 9: 64–69
- Bianucci, Giovanni; Di Celma, Claudio; Urbina, Mario; Lambert, Olivier (2016), "New beaked whales from the late Miocene of Peru and evidence for convergent evolution in stem and crown Ziphiidae (Cetacea, Odontoceti)" (PDF), PeerJ, 4 e2479, Bibcode:2016PeerJ...4e2479B, doi:10.7717/peerj.2479, PMC 5036081, PMID 27688973, archived from the original (PDF) on 2020-02-21
- Brand, Leonard; Urbina, Mario; Chadwick, Arthur; DeVries, Thomas J.; Esperante, Raul (2011), "A high resolution stratigraphic framework for the remarkable fossil cetacean assemblage of the Miocene/Pliocene Pisco Formation, Peru", Journal of South American Earth Sciences, 31 (4): 414–425, Bibcode:2011JSAES..31..414B, doi:10.1016/j.jsames.2011.02.015
- Collareta, Alberto; Lambert, Olivier; De Muizon, Christian; Urbina, Mario; Bianucci, Giovanni (2017), "Koristocetus pescei gen. et sp. nov., a diminutive sperm whale (Cetacea: Odontoceti: Kogiidae) from the late Miocene of Peru", Fossil Record, 20 (2): 259–278, Bibcode:2017FossR..20..259C, doi:10.5194/fr-20-259-2017, hdl:11568/891486
- Lambert, Olivier; Bianucci, Giovanni; Urbina, Mario; Geisler, Jonathan H. (2017), "A new inioid (Cetacea, Odontoceti, Delphinida) from the Miocene of Peru and the origin of modern dolphin and porpoise families", Zoological Journal of the Linnean Society, 179 (4): 919–946
- Marx, Felix G.; Lambert, Olivier; De Muizon, Christian (2017), "A new Miocene baleen whale from Peru deciphers the dawn of cetotheriids", Royal Society Open Science, 4 (9) 170560, Bibcode:2017RSOS....470560M, doi:10.1098/rsos.170560, PMC 5627101, PMID 28989761
- Marx, Felix G.; Kohno, Naoki (2016), "A new Miocene baleen whale from the Peruvian desert", Royal Society Open Science, 3 (10) 160542, Bibcode:2016RSOS....360542M, doi:10.1098/rsos.160542, PMC 5098998, PMID 27853573
- Poma Porras, Orlando; Horna Santillán, Edgard; Esperante, Raúl (2009), "Baleen Fósil (Cetacea: mysticeti) en Sedimentos de la Cuenca Marina del Neógeno en la Formación Pisco, al Sur del Perú" (PDF), Revista de Investigación Universitaria, 1: 84–97, archived from the original (PDF) on 2017-09-05
- Ramassamy, Benjamin; Lambert, Olivier; Collareta, Alberto; Urbina, Mario; Bianucci, Giovanni (2018), "Description of the skeleton of the fossil beaked whale Messapicetus gregarius: searching potential proxies for deep-diving abilities" (PDF), Fossil Record, 21 (1): 11–32, Bibcode:2018FossR..21...11R, doi:10.5194/fr-21-11-2018
- Solís Mundaca, Flavio Alejandro (2018), Bioestratigrafía e implicancias paleoceanográficas de las diatomeas de la sección Cerro Caucato, Formación Pisco, Ica, Peru (MSc. thesis) (PDF), Universidad Peruana Cayetano Heredia, pp. 1–158, archived from the original (PDF) on 2018-09-11
- Stucchi, Marcelo; Emslie, Steven D.; Varas Malca, Rafael M.; Urbina Schmitt, Mario (2015a), "A new late Miocene condor (Aves, Cathartidae) from Peru and the origin of South American condors", Journal of Vertebrate Paleontology, 35 (5) e972507, Bibcode:2015JVPal..35E2507S, doi:10.1080/02724634.2015.972507
- Stucchi, Marcelo; Varas Malca, Rafael M.; Urbina Schmitt, Mario (2015b), "New Miocene sulid birds from Peru and considerations on their Neogene fossil record in the Eastern Pacific Ocean" (PDF), Acta Palaeontologica Polonica, 61 (2): 417–427
- Stucchi, M (2007), "Los pingüinos de la Formación Pisco (Neógeno), Perú" (PDF), 4th European Meeting on the Palaeontology and Stratigraphy of Latin America, Cuadernos del Museo Geominero, 8: 367–373

Quehua Formation

- Baldellón P., Eddy; Fornari, Michel; Espinoza R., Félix; Soler, Pierre (1994), Sucesión Estructural de la Zona Serranía de las Minas (PDF), Memorias del XI Congreso Geológico de Bolivia, pp. 238–247

Raigón Formation

- Tófalo, Ofelia Rita; Morrás, Héctor J.M. (2009), "Evidencias paleoclimáticas en duricostras, paleosuelos y sedimentitas silicoclásticas, del Cenozoico de Uruguay" (PDF), Revista de la Asociación Geológica Argentina: 674–686

Saldungaray Formation

- Verzi, Diego H.; Montalvo, Claudia I.; Deschamps, Cecilia M. (2008), "Biostratigraphy and biochronology of the Late Miocene of central Argentina: Evidence from rodents and taphonomy", Geobios, 41 (1): 145–155, Bibcode:2008Geobi..41..145V, doi:10.1016/j.geobios.2006.09.005

Salicas Formation

- Brandoni, Diego; Schmidt, Gabriela I.; Candela, Adriana M.; Noriega, Jorge I.; Brunetto, Ernesto; Fiorelli, Lucas E. (2012), "Mammals from the Salicas Formation (Late Miocene), La Rioja Province, Northwestern Argentina: Paleobiogeography, age and paleoenvironment" (PDF), Ameghiniana, 49 (3): 1–13, Bibcode:2012Amegh..49..375B, doi:10.5710/AMGH.v49i3(467)

Solimões Formation

- Bocquentin, Jean; Melo, Janira (2006), "Stupendemys souzai sp. nov. (Pleurodira, Podocnemididae) from the Miocene-Pliocene of the Solimões Formation, Brazil" (PDF), Revista Brasileira de Paleontologia, 9 (2): 187–192, Bibcode:2006RvBrP...9..187B, doi:10.4072/rbp.2006.2.02
- Carvalho, Patricia; Bocquentin, Jean; De Lapparent de Broin, France (2002), "Une nouvelle espèce de Podocnemis (Pleurodira, Podocnemididae) provenant du Néogène de la formation Solimões, Acre, Brésil", Geobios, 35 (6): 677–686, Bibcode:2002Geobi..35..677C, doi:10.1016/S0016-6995(02)00081-5
- Cozzuol, Mario Alberto (2006), "The Acre vertebrate fauna: Age, diversity, and geography", Journal of South American Earth Sciences, 21 (3): 185–203, Bibcode:2006JSAES..21..185C, doi:10.1016/j.jsames.2006.03.005
- Kerber, Leonardo; Bissaro Júnior, Marcos César; Negri, Francisco R.; De Souza Filho, Jonas Pereira; Guilherme, Edson; Schmaltz Hsiou, Annie (2017), "A new rodent (Caviomorpha: Dinomyidae) from the upper Miocene of southwestern Brazilian Amazonia" (PDF), Historical Biology: An International Journal of Paleobiology, 30 (7): 985–993, Bibcode:2018HBio...30..985K, doi:10.1080/08912963.2017.1327529
- Kerber, Leonardo; Negri, Francisco Ricardo; Ribeiro, Ana Maria; Vucetich, Maria Guiomar; De Souza Filho, Jonas Pereira (2016), "Late Miocene potamarchine rodents from southwestern Amazonia, Brazil—with description of new taxa" (PDF), Acta Palaeontologica Polonica, 61 (1): 191–203, Bibcode:2016AcPaP..61..191K, doi:10.4202/app.00091.2014

Urumaco Formation

- Carrillo Briceño, Jorge D.; Maxwell, Erin; Aguilera, Órangel A.; Sánchez, Rodolfo; Sánchez Villagra, Marcelo R. (2015), "Sawfishes and Other Elasmobranch Assemblages from the Mio-Pliocene of the South Caribbean (Urumaco Sequence, Northwestern Venezuela)", PLoS ONE, 10 (10) e0139230, Bibcode:2015PLoSO..1039230C, doi:10.1371/journal.pone.0139230, PMC 4619466, PMID 26488163
- Linares, Omar J (2004), "Bioestratigrafía de la fauna de mamíferos de las formaciones Socorro, Urumaco y Codore (Mioceno Medio-Plioceno Temprano) de la región de Urumaco, Falcón, Venezuela" (PDF), Paleobiología Neotropical, 1: 1–26, archived from the original (PDF) on 2017-07-22
- Quijano Ballesteros, Jhon Richard (2005), Estudio magnetoestratigráfico en la sección de El Mamón (miembro medio de la Formación Urumaco, Estado Falcón) (MSc. thesis) (PDF), Universidad Simón Bolívar, pp. 1–92, archived from the original (PDF) on 2018-04-09
- Rincón, Ascanio D.; Solórzano, Andrés; McDonald, H. Gregory; Montellano Ballesteros, Marisol (2018), "Two new megalonychid sloths (Mammalia: Xenarthra) from the Urumaco Formation (late Miocene), and their phylogenetic affinities", Journal of Systematic Palaeontology, 17 (5): 409–421, doi:10.1080/14772019.2018.1427639
- Rincón, Ascanio D.; McDonald, H. Gregory; Solórzano, Andrés; Núñez Flores, Mónica; Ruiz Ramoni, Damián (2015), "A new enigmatic Late Miocene mylodontoid sloth from northern South America", Royal Society Open Science, 2 (2) 140256, Bibcode:2015RSOS....240256R, doi:10.1098/rsos.140256, PMC 4448802, PMID 26064594
