= Cerro Azul Formation =

Geological formation in Argentina

- Stratigraphic range: Tortonian (Huayquerian); ~10–5.7 Ma
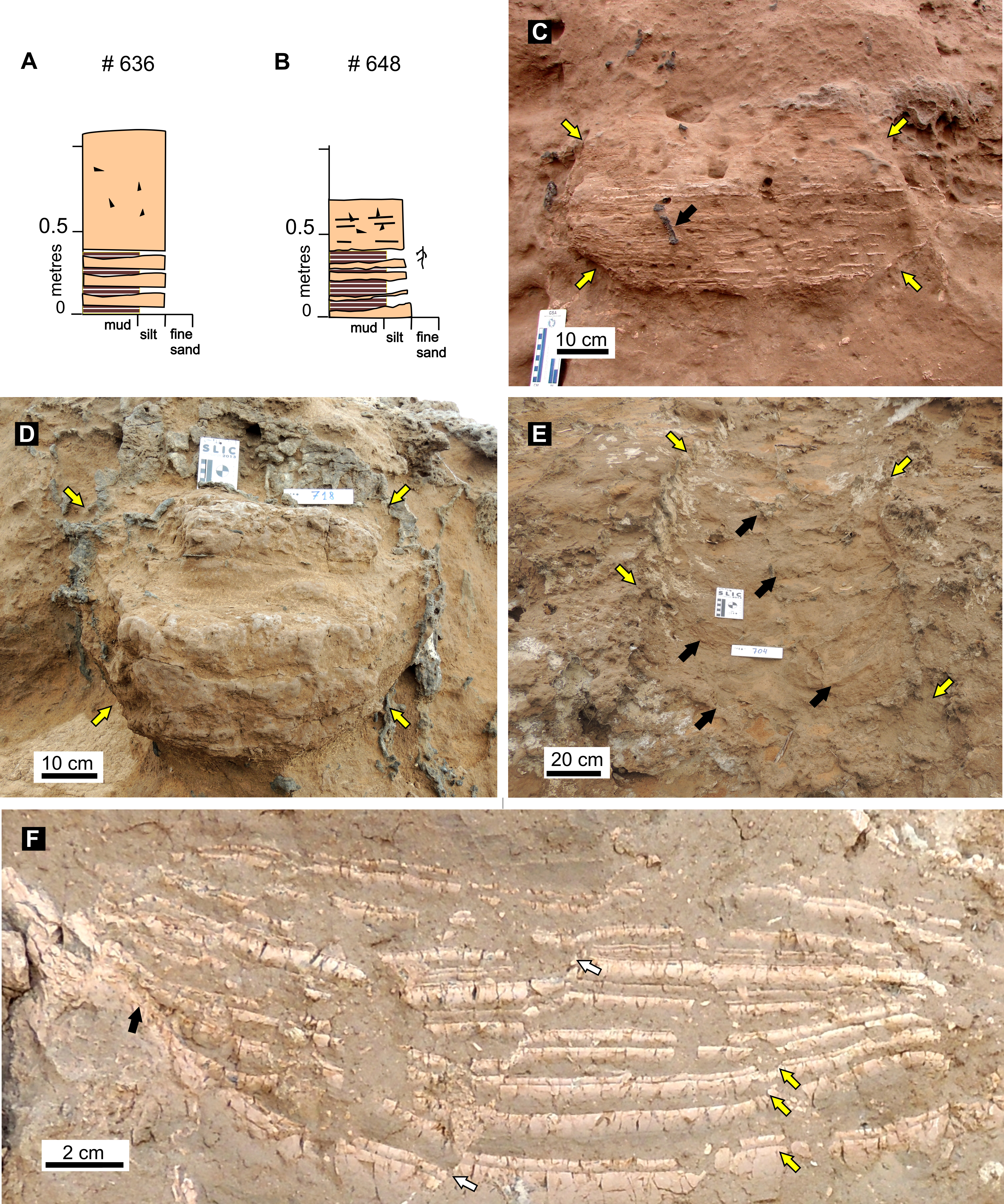
- Fossil burrow fills in the Cerro Azul Formation
- Type: Geological formation
- Underlies: alluvium
- Overlies: Arroyo Chasicó Formation or Crystalline basement
- Thickness: 54 m (177 ft) (outcrop); 180 m (590 ft) (subsurface)

Lithology
- Primary: Siltstone, sandstone
- Other: Conglomerate

Location
- Coordinates: 35.7°S 64.7°W
- Approximate paleocoordinates: 35.9°S 62.7°W
- Region: Buenos Aires & La Pampa Provinces
- Country: Argentina
- Extent: Colorado Basin

Type section
- Named for: Cerro Azul, Epecuén Lake
- Named by: Linares et al.
- Year defined: 1980
- Cerro Azul Formation (Argentina)

The Cerro Azul Formation (Spanish: Formación Cerro Azul), also described as Epecuén Formation, is a geological formation of Late Miocene (Tortonian, or Huayquerian in the SALMA classification) age in the Colorado Basin of the Buenos Aires and La Pampa Provinces in northeastern Argentina.

The fluvial and aeolian siltstones, sandstones and tuffs of the formation contain many mammals, such as Thylacosmilus and Huayqueriana, reptiles, amphibians and fossils of terror birds as well as Argentavis, the largest flying bird ever discovered.

== Description ==
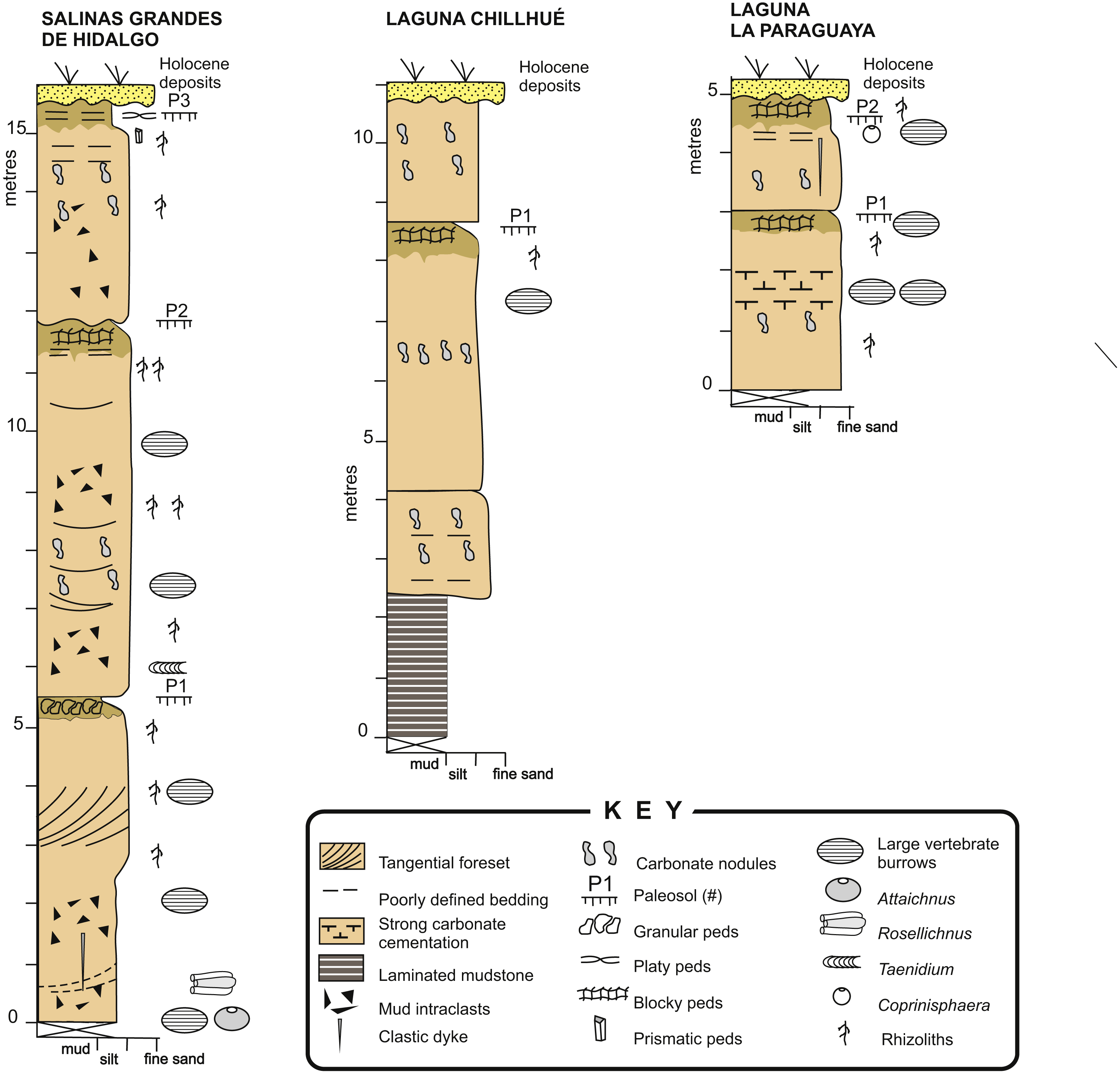
Sedimentary logs of the Cerro Azul Formation

The Cerro Azul Formation crops out in patches in the southwestern Buenos Aires Province and southeastern Pampa Province. The Epecuén Formation has been correlated to the Cerro Azul Formation in the early 2000s. The Cerro Azul and Epecuén Formations were named after the Cerro Azul ("Blue Hill") and Epecuén Lake where the formation crops out. The formation overlies crystalline basement or the Arroyo Chasicó Formation. The mammal assemblage of the Cerro Azul-Epecuén unit is the most diverse for the Huayquerian Late Miocene age, possibly ranging into the Pliocene. The formation is considered contemporaneous with the Río Negro Formation of the Colorado Basin.

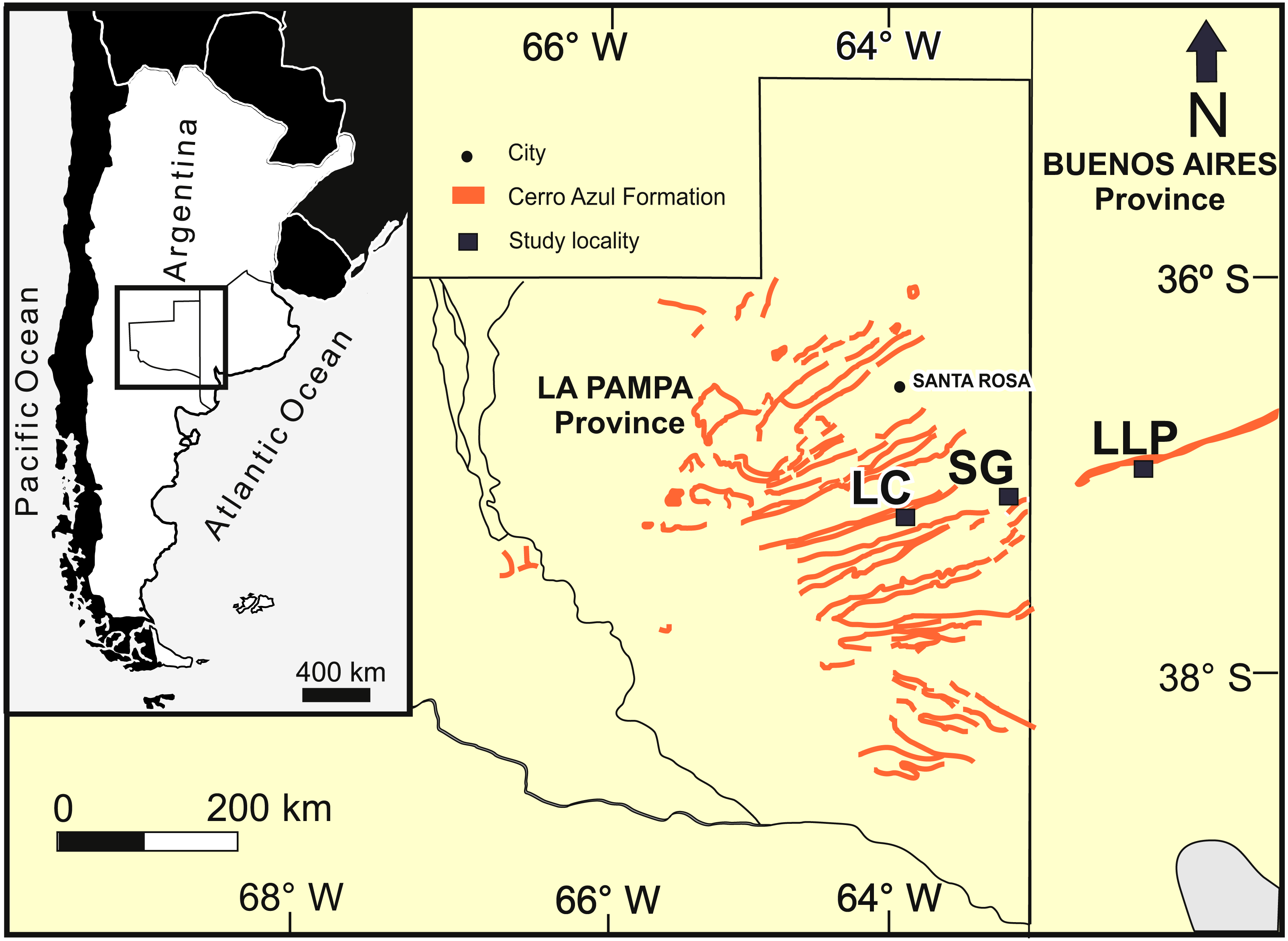
Outcrop map of the Cerro Azul Formation

The unit is characterized by a monotonous succession of loess containing moderately developed paleosols. In particular, the formation is considered to represent the interval between 10 and 5.7 Ma. The maximum exposed thickness in outcrop is 54 metres (177 ft), although the unit reaches about 180 metres (590 ft) in the subsurface.

The Cerro Azul Formation deposits were described by Linares et al. in 1980. They are discontinuous along the whole occupied area in the provinces of La Pampa and Buenos Aires. They are composed of silts, sandy silts, and very thin silty sands, reddish and brown colored, with a homogeneous and compact general aspect, and frequent carbonate nodules and evidence of pedogenic processes. Visconti et al. (2010) interpreted them as eolian deposits characterized by loessic materials, with a high percentage of lithic fragments and volcaniclastic sediments.

The sediments and their fauna belong to a sedimentary and faunal cycle, which followed the withdrawal (around 10 Ma) of a widespread marine transgression that extended from central Argentina to western Uruguay and southern Paraguay and Brazil, the "Paraná Sea" or mar paranense in Spanish.

Large cylindrical sediment-filled structures, 115 of which are interpreted as mammal burrows, occur within the loess-paleosol sequence of the formation.

== Locations ==
The following fossils have been recovered from the formation:

Locations:

La Pampa

- Barrancas Coloradas - Cerro Azul Formation - La Pampa
- Caleufú - Cerro Azul Formation - La Pampa
- Cerro El Chancho - Cerro Azul Formation - La Pampa
- Cerro Patagua - Cerro Azul Formation - La Pampa
- Estancia Don Mariano - Cerro Azul Formation - La Pampa
- Estancia El Recado - Cerro Azul Formation - La Pampa
- Estancia Ré - Cerro Azul Formation - La Pampa
- El Guanaco - Cerro Azul Formation - La Pampa
- Huayquerías de San Carlos - Cerro Azul Formation - La Pampa
- Laguna Chillhué - Cerro Azul Formation - La Pampa
- Laguna Guatraché - Cerro Azul Formation - La Pampa
- Quehué - Cerro Azul Formation - La Pampa
- Salinas Grandes de Hidalgo - Cerro Azul Formation - La Pampa
- Telen - Cerro Azul Formation - La Pampa

Buenos Aires

- Bajo Giuliani - Cerro Azul Formation - Buenos Aires
- Barrancas de Sarmiento - Cerro Azul Formation - Buenos Aires
- Eduardo Castex - Cerro Azul Formation - Buenos Aires
- Estancia los Médanos - Cerro Azul Formation - Buenos Aires
- Estancia Quiñi-Malal - Cerro Azul Formation - Buenos Aires
- Grünbein Cantera Seminario - Cerro Azul Formation - Buenos Aires
- Grünbein Cantera Seminario Level 2 - Cerro Azul Formation - Buenos Aires
- Laguna Epecuén - Cerro Azul Formation - Buenos Aires
- Laguna La Paraguaya - Cerro Azul Formation - Buenos Aires
- Puesto Colorado - Cerro Azul Formation - Buenos Aires
- Ruta 14 - Cerro Azul Formation - Buenos Aires
- Arroyo Guaminí - Epecuén Formation - Buenos Aires
- Carhué - Epecuén Formation - Buenos Aires
- Laguna de los Paraguayos - Epecuén Formation - Buenos Aires
- Robilote Field - SE of Epecuén lagoon & E of Laguna de Epecuén - Epecuén Formation - Buenos Aires
- Salinas Grandes de Hidalgo - Epecuén Formation - Buenos Aires

== Paleofauna ==
=== Amphibians ===
Taxa	Species	Presence	Abundance	Description	Images	Notes
Ceratophrynidae	C. sp.	Quehué				
Lepidobatrachus	L. sp.	Quehué				

=== Birds ===
==== Cathartid ====
Taxa	Species	Presence	Abundance	Description	Images	Notes
Argentavis	A. magnificens	Salinas de Hidalgo	An associated partial skeleton with portions of the skull, right quadrate, and parts of the legs and arms.	A giant teratornithidae bird		

==== Phorusrhacids ====
Taxa	Species	Presence	Abundance	Description	Images	Notes
Devincenzia	D. pozzi	Carhué				
Procariama	P. simplex	Salinas de Hidalgo				
Phorusrhacidae	indet.					

==== Tinamou ====
Taxa	Species	Presence	Abundance	Description	Images	Notes
Eudromia	E. sp.	Salinas de Hidalgo				
Nothura	N. sp.	Bajo Giuliani; El Guanaco; Salinas de Hidalgo				

==== Rheidae ====
Taxa	Species	Presence	Abundance	Description	Images	Notes
Rhea	R. sp.	Salinas de Hidalgo				

=== Mammals ===
==== Carnivora ====
Taxa	Species	Presence	Abundance	Description	Images	Notes
Cyonasua	C. brevirostris	Salinas de Hidalgo		A procyonid mammal.		
Cyonasua	C. prebrevirostris	Salinas de Hidalgo		A procyonid mammal.		
Cyonasua	C.sp.	Telén		A procyonid mammal.		

==== Sparassodonts ====
Taxa	Species	Presence	Abundance	Description	Images	Notes
Borhyaenidium	B. musteloides	Salinas de Hidalgo				
Dimartinia	D. pristina	Arroyo Chasicó	A left dentary and its associated teeth	A thylacosmiliform		
Thylacosmilus	T. atrox	El Guanaco; Quehué; Salinas de Hidalgo		A saber-toothed thylacosmilid		
Borhyaenidae	indeterminate.	Telén				

==== Didelphimorphs ====
Taxa	Species	Presence	Abundance	Description	Images	Notes
Didelphinae	indet.	Telén				
Hyperdidelphys	H. pattersoni	El Guanaco; Telén				
Hyperdidelphys	H. sp.	Salinas Grandes de Hidalgo				
Lutreolina	L. sp.	Salinas de Hidalgo				
Sparassocynidae	indet.	Telen				
Thylamys	T. pinei	Laguna Chillhué				
Thylamys	T. zetti	Estancia Ré; Arroyo Guaminí				
Thylatheridium	T. dolgopolae	El Guanaco; Quehué; Telén				
Thylatheridium	T. hudsoni	Bajo Giuliani; Telén				
Thylatheridium	T. sp.	Estancia Ré; Telén				
Zygolestes	Z. tatei	Bajo Giuliani				

==== Polydolopimorphia ====
Taxa	Species	Presence	Abundance	Description	Images	Notes
Argyrolagus	A. rusconii	Bajo Giuliani; El Guanaco; Barrancas Coloradas				
Argyrolagidae	indet.	Telén				
Lelvunlagus	L. rusconii	Cerro Patagua, Bajo Giuliani, and Laguna Epecuén	Cranial material, partial mandibles, and isolated teeth	An argyrolagid		
Pliolestes	P. venetus	Bajo Giuliani; Laguna Chillhué				

==== Rodents ====
Taxa	Species	Presence	Abundance	Description	Images	Notes
Abrocoma	A. antiqua	Estancia Ré				
Cardiatherium	C. aff. orientalis	Laguna Chillhué; Laguna Guatraché				
Cardiomys	C. sp.	Salinas de Hidalgo				
Chasichimys	C. bonaerense	Cerro Patagua				
Chasichimys	C. scagliai	Laguna Chillhué				
Chasichimys	C. sp.	Bajo Giuliani				
Caviidae	indet.	Barrancas de Sarmiento				
Clyomys	C. aff. sp.	Barrancas Coloradas				
Ctenomyidae	indet.	Telén				
Dolicavia	D. sp.	Grünbein Cantera Seminario				
Echimyidae	indet.	Telén				
Hydrochoeridae	indet.	Salinas de Hidalgo				
Neocavia	N. pampeana	Estancia El Recado				
Lagostomus	L. pretrichodactyla	Salinas de Hidalgo				
Lagostomus	L. (Lagostomopsis) sp.	Grünbein Cantera Seminario; Barrancas de Sarmiento; Estancia Ré; Salinas de Hidalgo				
Neocavia	N. sp.	Grünbein Cantera Seminario				
Neophanomys	N. pristinus	Estancia Don Mariano; Quehué				
Neophanomys	N. sp.	Estancia Ré				
Palaeocavia	P. sp.	Grünbein Cantera Seminario; Barrancas de Sarmiento; Estancia Ré				
Palaeoctodon	P. aff. simplicidens	Bajo Giuliani				
Pampamys	P. emmonsae	Laguna Chillhué; Bajo Giuliani; Estancia Ré				
Phtoramys	P. hidalguense	Barrancas Coloradas; Salinas de Hidalgo				
Phtoramys	P. cf. hidalguense	Grünbein Cantera Seminario				
Phtoramys	P. sp.	Estancia Ré				
Proctenomys	P. simpsoni	El Guanaco; Barrancas Coloradas				
Protabrocoma	P. chasicoensis	Telén				
Octodontoidea	indet.	Estancia Ré				
Orthomyctera	O. sp.	Grünbein Cantera Seminario; Salinas de Hidalgo				
Reigechimys	R. octodontiformis	Bajo Giuliani; Estancia Ré				
Reigechimys	R. plesiodon	Laguna Chillhué				
Reigechimys	R. simplex	Bajo Giuliani				
Tetrastylus	T. araucanus	Salinas de Hidalgo				
Tetrastylus	Tetrastylus sp.	Telén				
Theridomysops	T. parvulus	Telén				
Xenodontomys	X. ellipticus	Grünbein Cantera Seminario; Barrancas de Sarmiento				

==== Xenarthrans ====
===== Cingulata =====
Taxa	Species	Presence	Abundance	Description	Images	Notes
Aspidocalyptus	A. castroi	Robilote Field; Salinas de Hidalgo				
Aspidocalyptus	A. sp.	Telén				
Aspidocalyptus	A. cf. sp.	Grünbein Cantera Relleno Sanitario Level 2				
Chasicotatus	C. ameghinoi	Laguna Chillhué; Estancia Don Mariano; Cerro Patagua; Cerro El Chancho; Cerro de los Guanacos; Puesto Colorado; Estancia Quiñi-Malal; Bajo Giuliani; El Guanaco; Telen; El Recado; Laguna Guatraché; Loventué; Quehué; Barrancas Coloradas; Estancia Ré; Salinas de Hidalgo				
Chasicotatus	C. cf. peiranoi	Grünbein Cantera Relleno Sanitario Level 2				
Chasicotatus	C. sp.	El Recado				
Chorobates	C. villosissimus	Laguna Chillhué; Estancia Don Mariano; Grünbein Cantera Relleno Sanitario Level 2 Puesto Colorado; Ruta 14; Estancia Quiñi-Malal; El Guanaco; Telen; El Recado; Loventué; Quehué; Estancia Ré; Salinas de Hidalgo				
Chorobates	Chorobates sp.	Grünbein Cantera Seminario				
Coscinocercus	C. brachyurus	Robilote Field; Salinas de Hidalgo				
Coscinocercus	C. marcalaini	Robilote Field; Salinas de Hidalgo				
Coscinocercus	C. sp.	Telén				
Doellotatus	D. chapadmalensis	El Recado; Salinas de Hidalgo				
Doellotatus	D. inornatus	Laguna Chillhué; Estancia Don Mariano; Grünbein Cantera Seminario; Puesto Colorado; Ruta 14; El Guanaco; El Recado; Laguna Guatraché; Loventué; Quehué; Barrancas Coloradas; Estancia Ré; Telén; Salinas de Hidalgo				
Doellotatus	D. cf. praecursor	Grünbein Cantera Seminario				
Doellotatus	D. sp.	Laguna La Paraguaya				
Eosclerocalyptus	E. sp.	Laguna La Paraguaya				
Eumysops	E. sp.	Laguna Chillhué				
Glyptodontidae	indet.	Laguna La Paraguaya; Salinas Grandes de Hidalgo				
Hoplophorus	H. sp.	Telén				
Hoplophractus	H. tapinocefalus	Laguna de los Paraguayos; Salinas de Hidalgo				
Hoplophractus	H. sp.	Telén				
Macrochorobates	M. chapalmalensis	El Guanaco; Barrancas Coloradas				
Macrochorobates	M. scalabrinii	Laguna Chillhué; Estancia Don Mariano; Telen; Loventué; Quehué; Salinas de Hidalgo				
Macroeuphractus	M. morenoi	Grünbein Cantera Relleno Sanitario Level 2 Puesto Colorado; Laguna Chillhué; Telen; El Recado; Laguna Guatraché; Loventué; Quehué; Barrancas Coloradas; Estancia Ré; Salinas de Hidalgo				
Macroeuphractus	M. retusus	Salinas de Hidalgo				
Macroeuphractus	M. sp.	Grünbein Cantera Relleno Sanitario Level 2 El Recado				
Paleuphractus	P. sp.	Salinas de Hidalgo				
Plohophorus	P. araucanus	Salinas de Hidalgo				
Proeuphractus	P. limpidus	Laguna Chillhué; Telén				
Proeuphractus	P. sp.	Laguna Chillhué; Cerro Patagua; Telen; El Recado; Laguna Guatraché; Quehué; Salinas de Hidalgo				
Pseudoplohophorus	P. cf. sp.	Grünbein Cantera Relleno Sanitario Level 2				
Vetelia	V. perforata	Cerro Patagua; Cerro de los Guanacos; Telén				
Zaedyus	Z. pichiy	Laguna Chillhué; Telen; Quehué				

===== Pilosans =====
Taxa	Species	Presence	Abundance	Description	Images	Notes
Mylodontidae	indet.	Telén				
Plesiomegatherium	P. sp.	Salinas de Hidalgo				
Proscelidodon	P. gracillimus	Estancia Don Mariano; Huayquerías de San Carlos; Laguna Epecuén; Bajo Giuliani; Laguna Chillhué; Loventué; Salinas Grandes de Hidalgo; Quehué; Barrancas Coloradas; Estancia Ré; Arroyo Guaminí; Laguna de los Paraguayos; Carhué				
Mcdonaldocnus	M. bondesioi					

==== Litopterns ====
Taxa	Species	Presence	Abundance	Description	Images	Notes
Brachytherium	B. cf. cuspidatum	Telén; Salinas de Hidalgo				
Diplasiotherium	D. pampa	Bajo Giuliani; Laguna Chillhué; Salinas de Hidalgo		A litoptern.		
Eoauchenia	E. cingulata	Robilote Field; Salinas de Hidalgo				
Eoauchenia	E. primitiva	El Guanaco				
Epecuenia	E. thoatherioides	Robilote Field; Salinas de Hidalgo				
Huayqueriana	H. cristata	Robilote Field; Salinas de Hidalgo		Previously called as Macrauchenia latidens.		
Litopterna	indet.	Telén				
Neobrachytherium	N. sp.	Bajo Giuliani; Salinas de Hidalgo				
Promacrauchenia	P. sp.	Grünbein Cantera Relleno Sanitario Level 2 Salinas de Hidalgo				
Proterotheriidae	indet.	Bajo Giuliani; Telén				

==== Notoungulate ====
Taxa	Species	Presence	Abundance	Description	Images	Notes
Hemihegetotherium	H. achataleptum	Cerro Patagua; Eduardo Castex; Cerro de los Guanacos; Puesto Colorado; Bajo Giuliani; Laguna Chillhué; Loventué; Salinas de Hidalgo		A hegetotheriidae notoungulate.		
Hemihegetotherium	H. lazai	Salinas de Hidalgo		A hegetotheriidae notoungulate.		
Mesotheriinae	indet.	Laguna La Paraguaya; Telén				
Paedotherium	P. bonaerense	Barrancas de Sarmiento		A notoungulate.		
Paedotherium	P. minor	Laguna La Paraguaya; Estancia Ré; Salinas de Hidalgo		A notoungulate.		
Paedotherium	P. cf. minor	Grünbein Cantera Seminario		A notoungulate.		
Paedotherium	P. sp.	Bajo Giuliani; Laguna Chillhué; Estancia Ré		A notoungulate.		
Pisanodon	P. nazari	Salinas de Hidalgo		A toxodont.		
Pseudotypotherium	P. carhuense	Robilote Field; Salinas de Hidalgo		A mesotheriidae notoungulate.		
Tremacyllus	T. impressus	Grünbein Cantera Seminario; Bajo Giuliani; Laguna Chillhué; Salinas Grandes de Hidalgo; Quehué; Barrancas Coloradas		A hegetotheriidae notoungulate.		
Typotheriodon	T. grandis	Robilote Field				
Typotheriopsis	T. minimus	Robilote Field		A Mesotheriidae notoungulate.		

=== Reptiles ===
Taxa	Species	Presence	Abundance	Description	Images	Notes
Tupinambis	T. sp.	Telén				
Chelidae	indet.	Telén				
Testudinidae	indet.	Salinas de Hidalgo				

== SALMA correlations ==
Huayquerian correlations in South America
Formation	Cerro Azul	Ituzaingó	Paraná	Camacho	Raigón	Andalhuala	Chiquimil	Las Flores	Maimará	Palo	Pebas	Muyu	Rosa	Saldungaray	Salicas	Urumaco	Map
Basin	Colorado	Paraná				Hualfín		Tontal	Andes	Salta	Amazon	Huasi	Altiplano	BA	Velasco	Falcón	Cerro Azul Formation (South America)
Country	Argentina			Uruguay		Argentina					Brazil Peru	Bolivia		Argentina		Venezuela	Cerro Azul Formation (South America)
Cardiatherium																	Cerro Azul Formation (South America)
Lagostomus																	Cerro Azul Formation (South America)
Macroeuphractus																	Cerro Azul Formation (South America)
Proeuphractus																	Cerro Azul Formation (South America)
Pronothrotherium																	Cerro Azul Formation (South America)
Pseudotypotherium																	Cerro Azul Formation (South America)
Thylacosmilus																	Cerro Azul Formation (South America)
Xotodon																	Cerro Azul Formation (South America)
Macraucheniidae																	Cerro Azul Formation (South America)
Primates																	Cerro Azul Formation (South America)
Rodents																	Cerro Azul Formation (South America)
Reptiles																	Cerro Azul Formation (South America)
Birds																	Cerro Azul Formation (South America)
Terror birds																	Cerro Azul Formation (South America)
Flora																	Cerro Azul Formation (South America)
Environments	Aeolian-fluvial	Fluvio-deltaic			Fluvial						Fluvio-lacustrine	Fluvial			Fluvio-lacustrine	Fluvio-deltaic	Huayquerian volcanoclastics Huayquerian fauna Huayquerian flora
Volcanic						Yes											Huayquerian volcanoclastics Huayquerian fauna Huayquerian flora

== See also ==
- South American land mammal ages
- Honda Group
- Ituzaingó Formation
- Pebas Formation
- Urumaco
