= Cuyo Basin =

Sedimentary basin in Mendoza, Argentina

- Cuenca Cuyana
- Location of the basin in Argentina
- Coordinates: 34°15′S 68°34′W
- Etymology: Cuyo River
- Country: Argentina
- States: Mendoza, San Juan
- Cities: Mendoza

Characteristics
- On/Offshore: Onshore
- Boundaries: Andes
- Part of: Andean foreland basins
- Area: ~30,000 km^{2} (12,000 sq mi)

Hydrology
- River: Cuyo River

Geology
- Basin type: Foreland basin
- Plate: South American
- Orogeny: Andean
- Age: Triassic-Pliocene
- Stratigraphy: Stratigraphy
- Field: Tupungato

Cuyo Basin (Spanish: Cuenca Cuyana) is a sedimentary basin in Mendoza Province, western Argentina. The Cuyo Basin has a NNW-SSE elongated shape and is limited to the west by the Sierra Pintada System and to the east by the Pampean pericraton. To the north the basin reaches the area around the city of Mendoza.

== Description ==
The Cuyo Basin has an approximate area of 30,000 square kilometres (12,000 sq mi). It has two major sub-basins: Cacheuta (Spanish: Subcuenca Cacheuta) in the north and Alvear (Spanish: Subcuenca Alvear) in the south. The northern fringes of Cacheuta sub-basin reaches into San Juan Province. The basin existed already during the Triassic but its current shape is derivative of the Andean orogeny.

The basin originated as a rift basin in the context of extensional tectonics and crustal thinning that followed the Paleozoic Gondwanide orogeny. (Note: These tectonics are not related to the break-up of Gondwana later in the Mesozoic.)

=== Stratigraphy ===
The stratigraphy of the Cuyo Basin comprises the following formations:

Age bold is SALMA type	Group	Formation	Lithologies	Depositional environment	Notes
Pleistocene		Tunuyán			
Mio-Pliocene; Huayquerian		Huayquerías	Mudstones, sandstones, tuff	Fluvial	
Miocene		Mogotes		Alluvial	
Miocene		La Pilona	Shales and sandstones	Alluvial	
Middle Miocene; Laventan		Mariño	Sandstones	Alluvial and eolian	
Late Oligocene; Deseadan		Mariño	Sandstones	Alluvial and eolian	
Early Oligocene	Hiatus				
Priabonian	Hiatus				
Bartonian; Divisaderan		Divisadero Largo		Fluvial	
Lutetian		Papagayos		Fluvial	
Early Eocene	Hiatus				
Paleocene	Hiatus				
Late Cretaceous	Hiatus				
Early Cretaceous		Punta de las Bardas	Basalts	Volcanic	
Late Jurassic		Punta de las Bardas	Basalts	Volcanic	
Late Jurassic		Barrancas	Sandstones and conglomerates	Alluvial to fluvial	
Rhaetian	Uspallata	Río Blanco		Fluvial-deltaic	
Norian	Uspallata	Río Blanco		Fluvial-deltaic	
Carnian	Uspallata	Cacheuta	Black shales	Lacustrine	
Carnian	Uspallata	Potrerillos	Tuffs, conglomerates, sandstones, shales	Alluvial to fluvial	
Ladinian	Uspallata	Cerro de las Cabras	Mudstones and conglomerates		
Anisian	Uspallata	Cerro de las Cabras	Mudstones and conglomerates		
Olenekian	Uspallata	Río Mendoza	Volcaniclastic conglomerates		
Induan	Uspallata	Río Mendoza	Volcaniclastic conglomerates		
Late Permian	Choiyoi Group				
Carboniferous	Hiatus				
Devonian	Hiatus				
Early Paleozoic	Cuyania				

== See also ==
- Geological history of the Precordillera terrane
- Colorado Basin, basin to the southeast of Cuyo Basin
- Ischigualasto-Villa Unión Basin, Triassic rift basin to the north of Cuyo Basin
- Neuquén Basin, Mesozoic rift basin to the south of Cuyo Basin
- Paraná Basin, basin to the northeast of Cuyo Basin
- Salta Basin, Mesozoic rift basin to the north of Cuyo Basin

== Notes and references ==
=== References ===
==== Bibliography ====
General

- Spalletti, L.A.; Fanning, C.M.; Rapela, C.W. (2008), "Dating the Triassic continental rift in the southern Andes: the Potrerillos Formation, Cuyo Basin, Argentina", Geologica Acta, 6 (3): 267–283
- Zencich, Silvia; Villar, Héctor J.; Boggetti, Daniel (2008), Sistema petrolero Cacheuta-Barrancas de la Cuenca Cuyana, Provincia de Mendoza, Argentina (PDF), Sistemas Petroleros de las Cuencas Andinas, pp. 109–134
- Finney, S.C (2007), "The parautochthonous Gonwanan origin of the Cuyania (greater Precordillera) terrane of Argentina: A re-evaluation of evidence used to support an allochthonous Laurentian origin", Geologica Acta, 5: 127–158
- Spalletti, L.; Morel, E.; Artabe, A.; Zavattieri, A.; Ganuza, D. (2005), "Stratigraphy, sedimentary facies and palaeoflora of the Potrerillos Triassic succession, Mendoza, Republic of Argentina", Revista Geológica de Chile, 32: 249–272, doi:10.4067/S0716-02082005000200005
- Keller, M.; Buggisch, W.; Lehnert, O. (1998), "The stratigraphical record of the Argentine Precordillera and its plate-tectonic background. The Proto-Andean Margin of Gondwana", Geological Society, London, Special Publications, 142: 35–56, doi:10.1144/GSL.SP.1998.142.01.03
- Yrigoyen, Marcelo R (1993), "Revisión estratigráfica del Neogeno de las Huayquerías de Mendoza septentrional, Argentina", Ameghiniana, 31: 125–138

Divisadero Largo Formation

- Simpson, G.G.; Minoprio, J.L.; Patterson, B. (1962), "The mammalian fauna of the Divisadero Largo Formation, Mendoza, Argentina", Bulletin of the Museum of Comparative Zoology, 127: 239–293

Huayquerías Formation

- Forasiepi, Analía M.; MacPhee, Ross D.E.; Hernández del Pino, Santiago; Schmidt, Gabriela I.; Amson, Eli; Grohé, Camille (2016), "Exceptional skull of Huayqueriana (Mammalia, Litopterna, Macraucheniidae) from the Late Miocene of Argentina: anatomy, systematics and paleobiological implications" (PDF), Bulletin of the American Museum of Natural History, 404: 1–76, doi:10.1206/0003-0090-404.1.1
- Garrido, Alberto C.; Bonini, Ricardo; Barbeau, David L. (2017), Paleoambiente, edad y vertebrados de la Formación Huayquerías, Mioceno tardio, Provincia de Mendoza, Republica Argentina, XX Congreso Geológico Argentino, pp. 50–55

Mariño Formation

- Cerdeño, Esperanza; Vera, Bárbara; Combina, Ana María (2018), "A new early Miocene Mesotheriidae (Notoungulata) from the Mariño Formation (Argentina): Taxonomic and biostratigraphic implications", Journal of South American Earth Sciences, 88: 118–131, Bibcode:2018JSAES..88..118C, doi:10.1016/j.jsames.2018.06.016, hdl:11336/158508
- Cerdeño, Esperanza; Guiomar Vucetich, M. (2007), "The first rodent from the Mariño Formation (Miocene) at Divisadero Largo (Mendoza, Argentina) and its biochronological implications" (PDF), Andean Geology, 34: 199–207, doi:10.5027/andgeoV34n2-a02
