= Journal of South American Earth Sciences =

- Discipline: Geology, Earth sciences
- Language: English
- Edited by: James Kellogg

Publication details
- History: 1988–present
- Publisher: Elsevier
- Frequency: 9/year
- Impact factor: 1.533 (2012)

Standard abbreviations
- ISO 4: J. S. Am. Earth Sci.

Indexing
- CODEN: JAESE9
- ISSN: 0895-9811
- LCCN: 88648203
- OCLC no.: 663657238

Links
- Journal homepage; Online access

The Journal of South American Earth Sciences is a peer-reviewed scientific journal published by Elsevier. It covers the earth sciences, primarily on issues that are relevant to South America, Central America, the Caribbean, Mexico, and Antarctica. The journal was established in 1988 and the editor-in-chief is James Kellogg (University of South Carolina). According to the Journal Citation Reports, the journal has a 2012 impact factor of 1.533.

== See also ==
- Ameghiniana
- Andean Geology
- Brazilian Journal of Geology
- Latin American Journal of Sedimentology and Basin Analysis
- Revista de la Asociación Geológica Argentina
