= Solimões Formation =

Geologic formation in Brazil

- Stratigraphic range: Tortonian-Messinian (Huayquerian-Montehermosan); ~9–6.5 Ma

Lithology
- Primary: Conglomerate, Sandstone

Location
- Region: Acre
- Country: Brazil
- Extent: Acre Basin
- Solimões Formation (Brazil)

The Solimoes Formation is a geologic formation located in the states of Acre and Amazonas in northwest Brazil. It preserves many fossils dating to the Miocene epoch of the Neogene period.

== Description ==
The Solimoes Formation is situated in the Acre Basin, a sedimentary basin formed by Andean tectonic events that occurred along the west margin of South America in the Neogene. It is traditionally dated to the Late Miocene by biostratigraphy and zircon geochronology. The formation is mostly consists of mudstones, siltstones and muddy sandstones, deposited under fluvio-lacustrine settings.

== Paleofauna ==
A diverse fauna of vertebrates have been discovered from the Solimoes Formation. The following vertebrates have been discovered.

=== Mammalia ===
Color key: Taxon / Reclassified taxon / Taxon falsely reported as present / Dubious taxon or junior synonym / Ichnotaxon / Ootaxon / Morphotaxon

Notes
Uncertain or tentative taxa are in small text
~~crossed out~~ taxa are discredited.

==== Primates ====
Taxon	Species	Location	Stratigraphic position	Material	Notes	Images
Acrecebus	A. fraileyi	Rio Acre, Patos and Cachoeria do Bandeira			A cebid monkey	
Solimoea	S. acrensis	Rio Acre, Patos and Cachoeria do Bandeira			An ateline monkey	
cf. Stirtonia (mammal)	S. sp.				An ateline monkey	
Parabrachyteles	P. vesperus				An ateline monkey	
Migmacebus.	M. juruaensis				A cebid monkey	

==== Marsupials ====
Taxon	Species	Location	Stratigraphic position	Material	Notes	Images
Didelphis	D. solimoensis				An early opossum	
Lutreolina	L. materdei				A lutrine opossum	

==== Rodents ====
Taxon	Species	Location	Stratigraphic position	Material	Notes	Images
Eumegamys	E. paranensis					
Ferigolomys	F. pacarana					
Neoepiblema	N. horridula					
Neoreomys	N. huilensis				A caviomorph rodent	
Phoberomys	P. burmeistri				A giant rodent.	
Potamarchus	P. adamiae				A dinomyid rodent	
Potamarchus	P. murinus				A dinomyid rodent	
Pseudopotamarchus	P. villanuevai					
Scleromys	S. colombianus				A dinomyid rodent	
Telicomys	T. amazonensis					
Caviodon	C. sp					
Cardiatherium	C. sp					
Tetrastylus	T. sp					
Eoincamys	E. sp					
Eobranisamys	E. sp					
Drytomomys	D. sp					

==== Notoungulates ====
Taxon	Species	Location	Stratigraphic position	Material	Notes	Images
Abothrodon	A. pricei				A haplodontheriidae	
Gyrinodon	G. quassus				A toxodont	
Haplodontherium	H. wildei				A haplodontheriidae	
Mesenodon	M. juruaenisis				A toxodont	
Mesotoxodon	M. pricei				A haplodontheriidae	
Minitoxodon	M. acrensis				A toxodont	
Neotrigodon	N. utoquineae				A haplodontheriidae	
Neotoxodon	N. pascuali				A toxodont	
Plesiotoxodon	P. amazonensis				A toxodont	
Purperia	P. cribatidens				A Leontiniid	
Toxodon	T. sp				A toxodont	
Trigodon	T. sp				A large horned toxodont.	
Trigodonops	T. lopesi				A haplodontheriidae	

==== Astrapotheres ====
Taxon	Species	Location	Stratigraphic position	Material	Notes	Images
Xenastrapotherium	X. amazonense				A astrapothere	

==== Xenarthrans ====
Taxon	Species	Location	Stratigraphic position	Material	Notes	Images
Kraglievichia	K. carinatum				A pampatheriid armadillo	Kraglievichia
Mionothropus	M. cartellei				A nothrotheriid ground sloth	Kraglievichia
Pseudoprepotherium	P. venezualem				A ground sloth.	Kraglievichia
Octodontobradys	O. puruensis				A mylodontid ground sloth	Kraglievichia
Urumacotherium	U. campbelli				A mylodontid ground sloth	Kraglievichia
Megatherium	M. sp				A megatheriid ground sloth	Kraglievichia
Hapalops	H. indifferens				A megatherioidea ground sloth	Kraglievichia
Anadasypus	A. sp				A dasypodini armadillo	Kraglievichia
Boreostemma	B. sp				A glyptodont armadillo	Kraglievichia
Plohophorus	P. sp				A glyptodont armadillo	Kraglievichia
Pliomorphus	P. sp				A megalonychidae ground sloth	Kraglievichia
cf. Protomegalonyx	P. sp				A megalonychidae ground sloth	Kraglievichia
cf. Planops	P. sp				A planopsinae ground sloth	Kraglievichia

=== Reptilia ===
Taxon	Species	Location	Stratigraphic position	Material	Notes	Images
Purussaurus	P. brasiliensis				A giant caiman.	Purussaurus Gryposuchus
Chelus	C. colombianus				A mata mata	Purussaurus Gryposuchus
Gryposuchus	G. jessei				A large gavialoid.	Purussaurus Gryposuchus
Mourasuchus	M. amazonensis				A large flat-snouted caiman.	Purussaurus Gryposuchus
Melanosuchus	M. latrubessei C. aff. crocodilus					Purussaurus Gryposuchus
Eunectes	E. sp				A prehistoric anaconda.	Purussaurus Gryposuchus
Stupendemys	S. souzai				A giant podocnemidid side-necked turtle	Purussaurus Gryposuchus
Acresuchus	P. pachytemporalis					Purussaurus Gryposuchus
Caiman	C. brevirostris					Purussaurus Gryposuchus
Caiman	C. aff. crocodilus					Purussaurus Gryposuchus

=== Aves ===
Taxon	Species	Location	Stratigraphic position	Material	Notes	Images
Anhinga	A. fraileyi					
Anhinga	A. grandis					
Anhinga	A. minuta					
Phorusrhacidae indet.	Indeterminate				A large indeterminate phorusrhacid.	
Macranhinga	M. ranzii				A large relative of the Anahinga.	

=== Fish ===
Taxon	Species	Location	Stratigraphic position	Material	Notes	Images
