= Ribodon =

Ribodon Temporal range: Tortonian (Mayoan-Huayquerian) ~11.61–7.25 Ma

Scientific classification
- Kingdom: Animalia
- Phylum: Chordata
- Class: Mammalia
- Infraclass: Placentalia
- Order: Sirenia
- Family: Trichechidae
- Genus: †Ribodon
- Species: †R. limbatus

Binomial name
- †Ribodon limbatus Ameghino, 1883

Genus of mammals

Ribodon is an extinct genus of manatee that lived around South America (Ituzaingó Formation, then described as Entrerriana Formation, Argentina, Solimões Formation, Brazil and Urumaco Formation, Urumaco, Venezuela) during the Tortonian (Mayoan to Huayquerian in the South American land mammal ages). The type species is R. limbatus.

Ribodon is considered the direct ancestor of the Trichechus genus to which all modern manatees belong and was the first manatee to exhibit supernumerary molars that were replaced throughout life, indicating a diet of abrasive plants. Ribodon is hypothesized to have inhabited both coastal and inland freshwater regions; however, in which of the two it originated is unknown.
