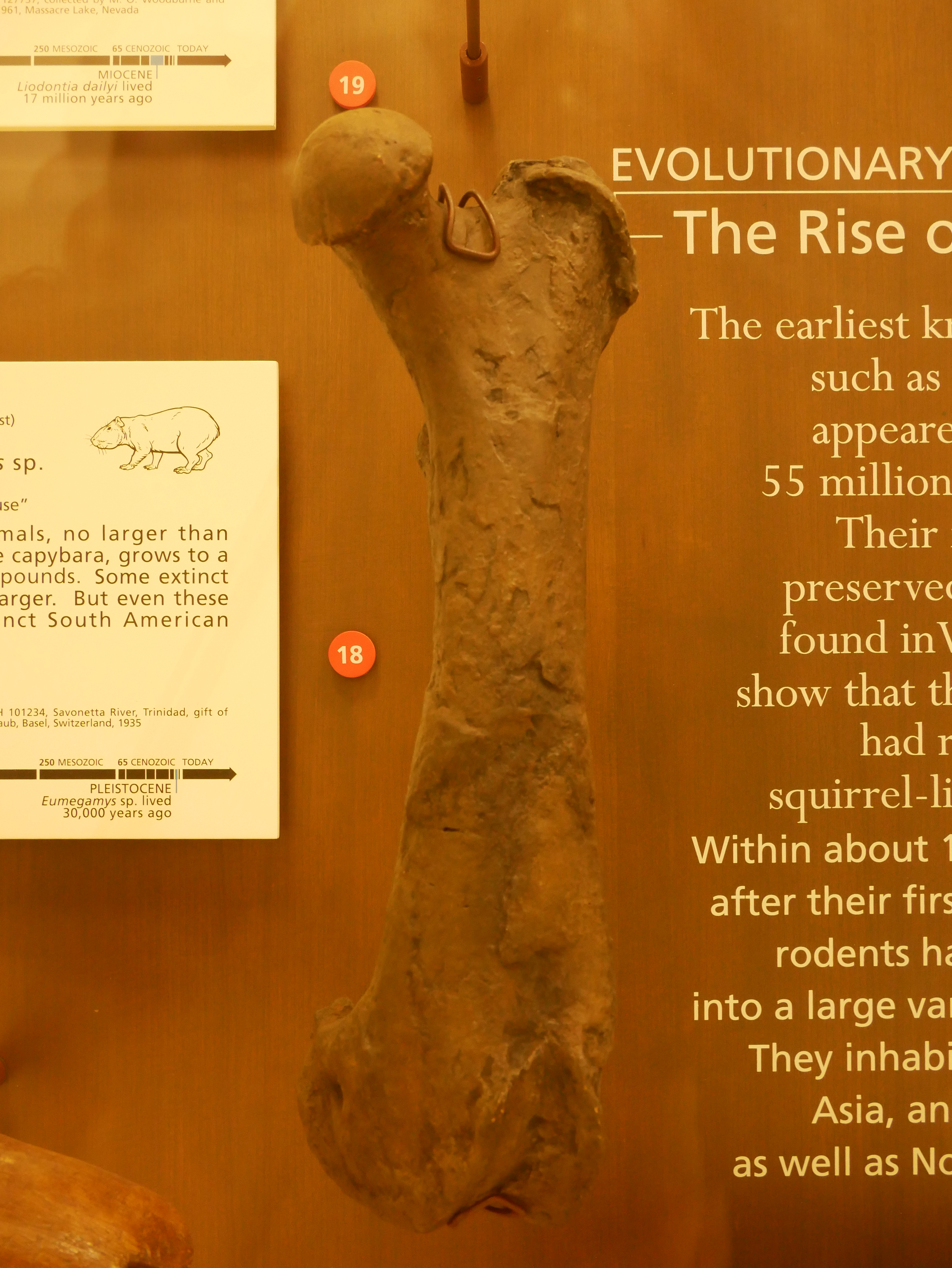
- Fossil femur of Eumegamys sp.

Scientific classification
- Domain: Eukaryota
- Kingdom: Animalia
- Phylum: Chordata
- Class: Mammalia
- Order: Rodentia
- Family: Dinomyidae
- Genus: †Eumegamys; Kraglievich, 1926

Synonyms
- Carlesia pendolai Kraglievich 1926

= Eumegamys =

Eumegamys Temporal range: Late Miocene-Late Pliocene (Huayquerian-Uquian) ~9.0–2.6 Ma

Extinct genus of rodents

Eumegamys is an extinct genus of dinomyid rodent from the late Miocene and Pliocene of Brazil (Solimões Formation), Venezuela (Urumaco Formation, Urumaco) and Argentina (Ituzaingó Formation) in South America. Its skull was 50 cm (1.64 ft) long.
