= Camacho Formation =

Geologic formation in Uruguay

- Stratigraphic range: Huayquerian; ~9.0–6.8 Ma
- Type: Geological formation

Location
- Country: Uruguay

The Camacho Formation is a Huayquerian geologic formation in Uruguay.

It also comprises the formerly named Kiyu Formation.

== Fossil content ==
The following fossils have been reported from the formation:

Mammals

- Arazamys
- Charruatoxodon
- Cyonasua
- Gomphotheridae indet.
- Isostylomys laurillardi
- Lestobradys sprechmanni
- Neobrachytherium ullumense
- Neoglyptatelus uruguayensis
- Proeuphractus limpidus
- Pseudobrachytherium

Birds

- Giganhinga

Fish

- Carcharhinus egertoni
- Otodus megalodon

== See also ==
- List of fossiliferous stratigraphic units in Uruguay

== Bibliography ==
- D. Perea and M. Ubilla. 1990. Los selacios (Chondrichthyes) de la Fm. Camacho (Mioceno sup., Uruguay). Revista de la Soco Uruguaya de Geología 2(4):5-13
- A. Rinderknecht, D. Perea, and H.G. McDonald. 2007. A New Mylodontinae (Mammalia, Xenarthra) from the Camacho Formation (Late Miocene), Uruguay. Journal of Vertebrate Paleontology 27(3):744-747
- Fernicola, Juan C.; Rinderknecht, Andrés; Jones, Washington; Vizcaíno, Sergio F.; Propino, Kleberson (2018), "A new species of Neoglyptatelus (Mammalia, Xenarthra, Cingulata) from the late Miocene of Uruguay provides new insights on the evolution of the dorsal armor in cingulates", Ameghiniana, 55 (3): 233–252, doi:10.5710/AMGH.02.12.2017.3150, hdl:11336/96801
- Rinderknecht, Andrés (2011), Estudio sobre los roedores gigantes del Uruguay, Departamento de San José (Mioceno tardío-Pliocene) y sus implicancias para la sistemática y taxonomía de la familia Dinomyidae (Mammalia, Rodentia) (PDF), Universidad de la República, pp. 1–101, archived from the original (PDF) on 2018-10-02
- Verde, Mariano (2002), Icnología de la formación Camacho (Mioceno tardío) del Uruguay (MSc. thesis) (PDF), Universidad de la República, pp. 1–125
