= Saurocetes =

Saurocetes Temporal range: 9.0–7.246 Ma Messinian

Scientific classification
- Kingdom: Animalia
- Phylum: Chordata
- Class: Mammalia
- Order: Artiodactyla
- Infraorder: Cetacea
- Family: Iniidae
- Genus: †Saurocetes; Burmeister, 1871

Species
- †S. argentinus (type) Burmeister, 1871; †S. gigas Cozzuol, 1988

Synonyms
- Pontoplanoides Ameghino, 1891; Saurodelphis Burmeister, 1891

Extinct iniid dolphin

Saurocetes is an extinct genus of probable iniid river dolphins from South America. Two species have been described: S. argentinus and S. gigas. It has been suggested that Saurocetes is a synonym of the possible platanistid Ischyrorhynchus.

== Description ==
Saurocetes remains are fragmentary, consisting of isolated teeth, rostral fragments and mandibular fragments.

== Taxonomy ==
Typically, Saurocetes is regarded as a member of the Iniidae, a family represented by one extant genus, Inia. However, it was noted as far back as 1926 that the taxonomy of Saurocetes is highly unstable, even at a family level. Several specimens referred to the possible platanistid genus Ischyrorhynchus closely resemble Saurocetes in many respects, and it is possible that the two genera are synonymous.
