= Cyonasua =

Cyonasua Temporal range: Late Miocene-Middle Pleistocene (Huayquerian-Ensenadan) 7.3–0.99 Ma

Scientific classification
- Kingdom: Animalia
- Phylum: Chordata
- Class: Mammalia
- Order: Carnivora
- Family: Procyonidae
- Genus: †Cyonasua; Ameghino, 1885

Species
- †C. argentina; †C. brevirostris; †C. clausa; †C. groeberi; †C. longirostris; †C. lutaria; †C. meranii; †C. pascuali; †C. robusta; †C. zettii

Extinct genus of carnivores

Cyonasua (meaning "dog-coati" in Greek) is an extinct genus of procyonid from the Late Miocene to Middle Pleistocene of South America. Fossils of Cyonasua have been found in Argentina (Ituzaingó, Epecuén, Huayquerías, Monte Hermoso, Chapadmalal, Maimará, Ensenada, La Playa, Chiquimil, Andalhuala, and Cerro Azul Formations), Bolivia (Tariquía Formation), Uruguay (Camacho Formation), and Venezuela (San Gregorio Formation). The oldest well-dated fossils of Cyonasua are approximately 7.3 million years old. Most fossils of Cyonasua are late Miocene to early late Pliocene (Huayquerian to Chapadmalalan SALMAs, 7.3-3 million years old) in age, but a single early Pleistocene specimen (the holotype and only known specimen of Cyonasua meranii) indicates that members of this genus survived until at least 0.99 million years ago (the fossil layer where this specimen was collected dating to the Jaramillo Chron).

Cyonasua is the oldest terrestrial carnivoran known from South America, and represents the earliest undisputed southward mammalian migrants of the Great American Interchange. Cyonasua appears in the fossil record much earlier than other North American immigrant groups, most of which did not appear until 3 million years ago, including other carnivorans, many of which did not appear in South America until the early Pleistocene (about 1.2 million years ago). The next oldest remains of carnivorans in South America are rare specimens of Lycalopex and Galictis from the Barrancalobian (~2.9 million years old), nearly 4.4 million years after the first appearance of Cyonasua in South America. The ancestors of Cyonasua are thought to have arrived from Central America by island hopping before the formation of the Isthmus of Panama.

Cyonasua arrived in South America when ecosystems there were still dominated by metatherian carnivores, namely sparassodonts and carnivorous opossums. Unlike most sparassodonts, which were hypercarnivores, Cyonasua was an omnivore and it is thought that it did not directly compete with sparassodonts for food. This is thought to be one possible reason why Cyonasua and its close relatives were able to colonize South America many millions of years before other carnivorans. Because sparassodonts and other native predators like terror birds and teratorns were hypercarnivores, and other predators such as opossums were much smaller than most procyonids, the large, omnivorous Cyonasua could occupy an otherwise unoccupied niche in South American ecosystems.

Cyonasua was much larger than any extant procyonid, weighing about 15–25 kg, about the same size as a medium-sized dog. However, it was much smaller than its later relative Chapalmalania, which was the size of a small bear. Chapalmalania is thought to have been closely related to Cyonasua, with the two genera frequently referred to as "Cyonasua-group procyonids". Chapalmalania is thought to have evolved from a species of Cyonasua in South America, with Cyonasua as traditionally defined potentially being paraphyletic.

Limb bones of Cyonasua suggest that this genus was a generalized terrestrial mammal with some capability to dig and climb, similar to raccoons (Procyon) and coatis (Nasua). Fossils of Cyonasua have been found inside crotovines (fossil burrows), but these are thought to have been made by the large armadillo Ringueletia and later occupied by Cyonasua. The teeth of Cyonasua suggest it was omnivorous, more carnivorous than most living procyonids, but less carnivorous than the modern ringtails (Bassariscus spp.)
