= Huayquerías Formation =

Geological formation in Argentina

- Stratigraphic range: Messinian-Zanclean (defined as Huayquerian); ~6.5–5 Ma
- Type: Geological formation
- Underlies: Tunuyán Formation
- Thickness: Up to 126 m (413 ft)

Lithology
- Primary: Mudstone
- Other: Sandstone, tuff

Location
- Coordinates: 33.8°S 69.0°W
- Approximate paleocoordinates: 34.0°N 66.9°W
- Region: Mendoza Province
- Country: Argentina
- Extent: Frontal Cordillera & Cuyo Basin

Type section
- Named by: Kraglievitch
- Year defined: 1934
- Region: Mendoza Province
- Country: Argentina
- Huayquerías Formation (Argentina)

The Huayquerías Formation (Spanish: Formación Huayquerías) is a Late Miocene fossiliferous geological formation of the Frontal Cordillera and Cuyo Basin of Argentina. The formation crops out in the central Mendoza Province.

The formation, with a maximum thickness of 126 metres (413 ft), comprises reddish mudstones with thin beds of tuffs and sandstones, deposited in a fluvial, environment. The tuff in the formation is dated to 5.84 ± 0.41 Ma, placing it in the Huayquerian SALMA, the age named after the formation by Kraglievitch in 1934.

The formation has provided fossils of the procyonid Cyonasua pascuali and the litoptern Huayqueriana cristata, named after the formation.

== Description ==
The Huayqueriás Formation, present in the Frontal Cordillera and the neighboring Cuyo Basin, was described in 1934 by Kraglievitch as the basis for the Huayquerian South American land mammal age. The name Huayquerías means "badlands". The formation comprises reddish mudstones with mudcracks, paleoburrows and ichnofossils of vertebrates. Thin sandstone layers of up to 12 centimetres (4.7 in) thick exist in the formation. An ashfall bed exists at 83 metres (272 ft) below the contact with the slightly angular unconformably overlying Tunuyán Formation in a total section of 126 metres (413 ft). The tuff has been dated using ^{40}K/^{40}Ar analysis to 5.84 ± 0.41 Ma.

== Paleontological significance ==
The Huayquerías Formation has been used to define the Huayquerian South American land mammal age, ranging from 9.0 to 6.8 Ma. However, later analysis of the ashfall bed in the formation, provided a much younger age of 5.84 ± 0.41 Ma, extending the temporal range of the Huayquerian SALMAans until near the Miocene-Pliocene limit. The Huayqueriás Formation has provided fossils of Cyonasua pascuali, and the litoptern Huayqueriana cristata, the latter of which, named after the formation.

== See also ==
- South American land mammal age
