= Arazamys =

Arazamys Temporal range: Huayquerian ~9.0–6.8 Ma

Scientific classification
- Kingdom: Animalia
- Phylum: Chordata
- Class: Mammalia
- Order: Rodentia
- Family: Dinomyidae
- Genus: †Arazamys; Rinderknecht et al., 2011

Type species
- Arazamys castiglionii

Synonyms

Extinct genus of rodents

Arazamys is an extinct genus of dinomyid rodent from the Huayquerian. Fossils have been found at the Camacho Formation in Uruguay.
