= Isostylomys =

Isostylomys Temporal range: Huayquerian ~9.0–6.8 Ma

Scientific classification
- Kingdom: Animalia
- Phylum: Chordata
- Class: Mammalia
- Infraclass: Placentalia
- Order: Rodentia
- Family: Dinomyidae
- Genus: †Isostylomys; Kraglievich, 1926

Synonyms

Extinct genus of rodents

Isostylomys is an extinct genus of dinomyid rodent from the Huayquerian. Fossils have been found at the Ituzaingó Formation in Argentina and Camacho Formation in Uruguay.

== Bibliography ==
- Candela, Adriana Magdalena (2005), "Los roedores del "Mesopotamiense" (Mioceno tardío, Formación Ituzaingó) de la provincia de Entre Ríos (Argentina)" (PDF), Insugeo, 14: 37–48
