= Latin American Journal of Sedimentology and Basin Analysis =

Geology journal

- Discipline: Sedimentology, Earth sciences
- Language: English, Spanish

Publication details
- Former name: Revista de la Asociación Argentina de Sedimentología
- History: 1994–present
- Publisher: Asociación Argentina de Sedimentología (Argentina)
- Frequency: Biannually

Standard abbreviations
- ISO 4: Lat. Am. J. Sedimentol. Basin Anal.

Indexing
- ISSN: 1851-4979 (print); 1669-7316 (web)

Links
- Journal homepage; Online archive; Journal page at SciELO

Latin American Journal of Sedimentology and Basin Analysis (formerly Revista de la Asociación Argentina de Sedimentología) is a biannual peer-reviewed scientific journal published by the Asociación Argentina de Sedimentología. The journal covers the field of sedimentology and sedimentary basin analysis.
