= Historical Biology =

Peer-reviewed scientific journal

- Language: English
- Edited by: Mark T. Young

Publication details
- History: 1988–present
- Publisher: Taylor & Francis
- Frequency: Monthly
- Impact factor: 1.4 (2023)

Standard abbreviations
- ISO 4: Hist. Biol.

Indexing
- CODEN: HIBIEW
- ISSN: 0891-2963 (print); 1029-2381 (web)
- LCCN: 88659240
- OCLC no.: 915061764

Links
- Journal homepage; Online access

Historical Biology is a peer-reviewed scientific journal of paleobiology. It was established in 1988 and is published by Taylor & Francis. The journal is edited by Mark T. Young.

== Abstracting and indexing ==
The journal is abstracted and indexed in the following databases.

- Academic Search Premier
- AGORA
- Biosis
- CIRC
- EMBASE
- GEOBASE
- OARE
- Science Citation Index
- Scopus

According to the Journal Citation Reports, the journal has a 2023 impact factor of 1.4.
