= Revista del Museo Argentino de Ciencias Naturales =

- Discipline: paleontology, botany, zoology, ecology, geology
- Language: English, Spanish

Publication details
- History: 1999–present
- Publisher: Museo Argentino de Ciencias Naturales (Argentina)
- Frequency: Biannual

Standard abbreviations
- ISO 4: Rev. Mus. Argent. Cienc. Nat.

Indexing
- ISSN: 1514-5158
- LCCN: 00252252
- OCLC no.: 44025757

Links
- Journal homepage

Revista del Museo Argentino de Ciencias Naturales is a peer-reviewed natural sciences journal published by the Museo Argentino de Ciencias Naturales (Argentine Museum of Natural Sciences). This journal is a merger of all subseries of: Revista del Museo Argentino de Ciencias Naturales "Bernardino Rivadavia" e Instituto Nacional de Investigación de las Ciencias Naturales, and all subseries of: Comunicaciones del Museo Argentino de Ciencias Naturales "Bernardino Rivadavia" e Instituto Nacional de Investigación de las Ciencias Naturales.
