= Geobios =

- Discipline: Paleontology
- Language: English

Publication details
- History: 1968–present
- Publisher: Elsevier (Netherlands)
- Frequency: Bimonthly
- Impact factor: 1.243 (2014)

Standard abbreviations
- ISO 4: Geobios

Indexing
- ISSN: 0016-6995

Links
- Journal homepage

Geobios is an academic journal published bimonthly by the publishing house Elsevier. Geobios is an international journal of paleontology, focusing on the areas of palaeobiology, palaeoecology, palaeobiogeography, stratigraphy and biogeochemistry.

Geobios is indexed and abstracted in: Science Citation Index, ISI, Bulletin signalétique, PASCAL, Geo Abstracts, Biological Abstracts, The Geoscience Database, Referativnyi Zhurnal, SciSearch, Research Alert and Current Contents/Physical, Chemical & Earth Sciences.

== Description ==
Articles are published only in English, following a standard peer-review process (usually involving 3 reviewers) supervised by an associate-editor through the journal's submission website. Articles are published both in print and in electronic format on the Geobios ScienceDirect website.

== History ==
Geobios was first published in 1968 by the Claude Bernard University Lyon 1. Up until 2011, the associate editors' board was exclusively based in Lyon, France and placed under the editorial responsibility of Louis David, André Schaaf, Patrick Racheboeuf, Serge Legendre, and Pierre Hantzpergue. Gilles Escarguel has been the editor-in-chief of Geobios since 2009.
