= Revista de la Asociación Geológica Argentina =

- Discipline: Geology
- Language: English, Spanish

Publication details
- History: 1946-present
- Publisher: Asociación Geológica Argentina (Argentina)
- Frequency: Irregularly
- Open access: Yes
- License: CC-BY-NC 2.5

Standard abbreviations
- ISO 4: Rev. Asoc. Geol. Argent.

Indexing
- ISSN: 0004-4822 (print); 1851-8249 (web)
- LCCN: gs47000261
- OCLC no.: 85449374

Links
- Journal homepage; Journal page at SciELO

The Revista de la Asociación Geológica Argentina is an open access peer-reviewed scientific journal published by the Asociación Geológica Argentina. The journal is released under a CC-BY-NC 2.5 license.

== See also ==
- Andean Geology
- Boletín de Geología
