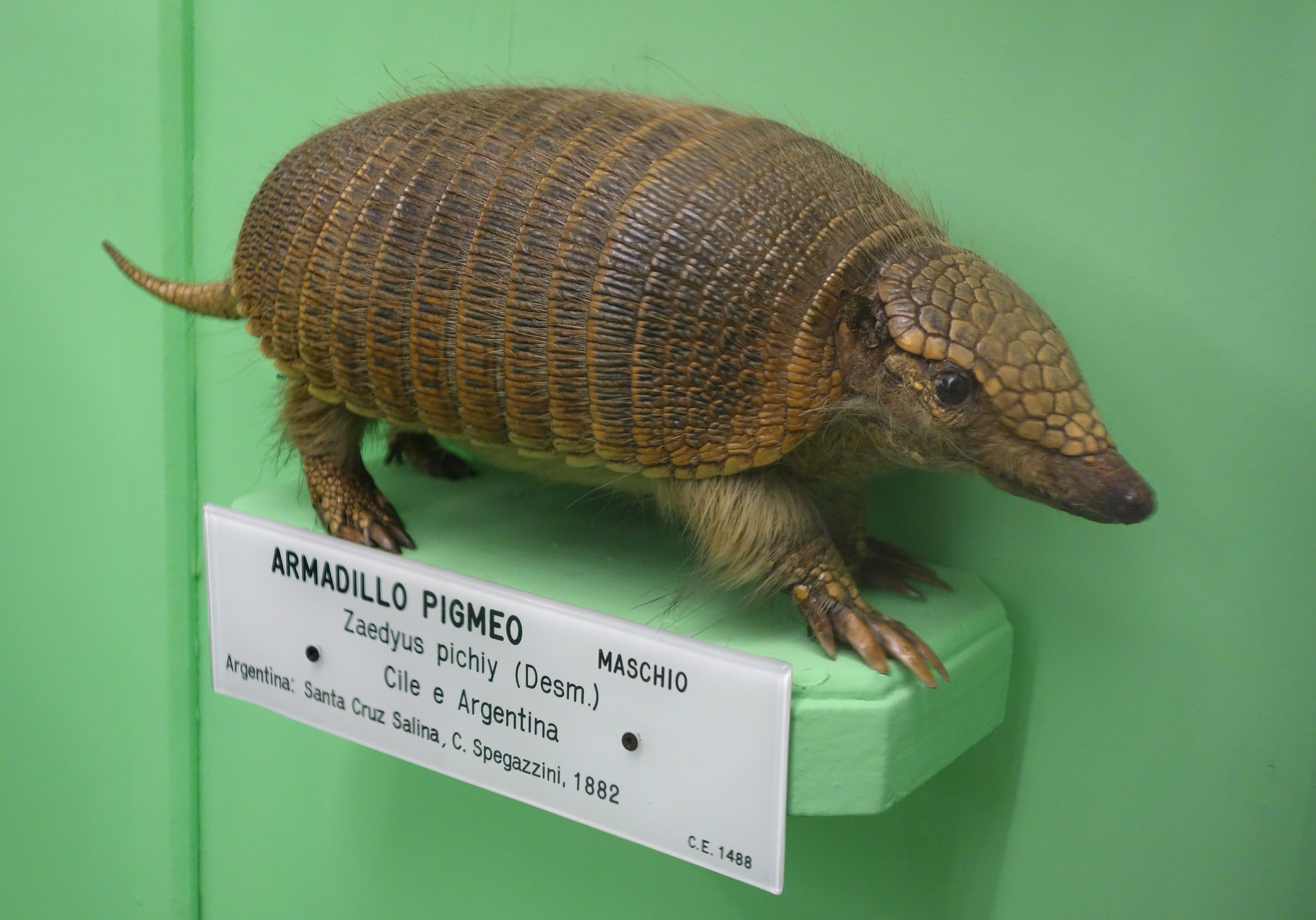
- Model at Museo Civico di Storia Naturale Giacomo Doria

Conservation status
- Near Threatened (IUCN 3.1)

Scientific classification
- Kingdom: Animalia
- Phylum: Chordata
- Class: Mammalia
- Order: Cingulata
- Family: Chlamyphoridae
- Subfamily: Euphractinae
- Genus: Zaedyus; Ameghino, 1889
- Species: Z. pichiy

Binomial name
- Zaedyus pichiy Desmarest, 1804
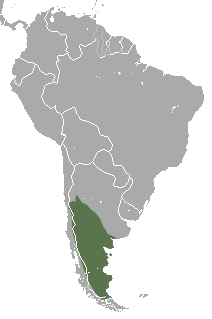
- Range of Zaedyus pichiy

Synonyms
- Dasypus minutus Desmarest, 1822; Loricatus pichiy Desmarest, 1804

= Pichi =

Pichi Temporal range: Tortonian–Recent

Species of mammal belonging to the armadillo order

The pichi (Zaedyus pichiy), dwarf armadillo or pygmy armadillo is an armadillo native to Argentina and Chile. It is the only living member of the genus Zaedyus, and the only armadillo to hibernate. Fossil remains from the Cerro Azul Formation indicate this species had already evolved during the late Miocene epoch.

== Description ==
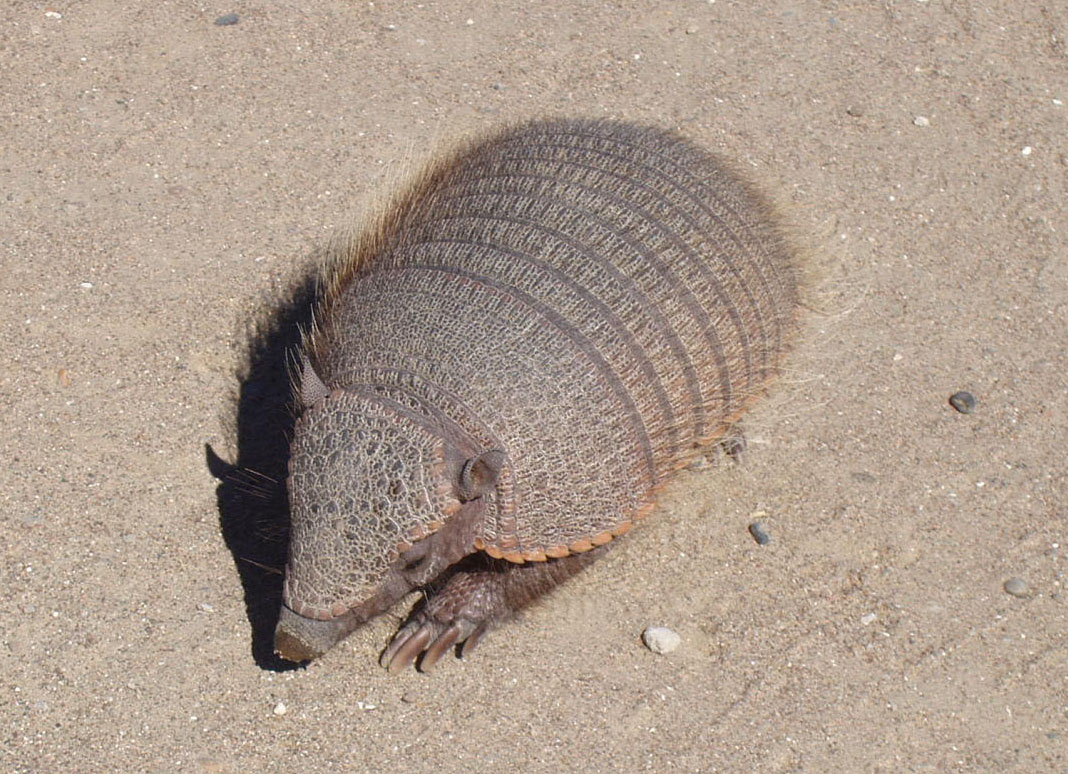
Pichi in Valdes Peninsula

Pichis are relatively small armadillos, measuring approximately 27 cm (11 in) long, with a tail of about 11 cm (4.3 in). Adults weigh anything from 700 to 1,500 grams (25 to 53 oz), and males may be slightly larger than females.

The carapace varies from light yellow to near-black, and consists of heavy scapular and pelvic shields composed of rectangular osteoderms, and separated by six to eight movable bands. An additional "nuchal" band lies in front of the scapular shield, and there is also a triangular shield on top of the head, and further osteoderms along the tail. The underside of the animal has a coat of tan-coloured hair, which is thicker and longer in winter; there are also a few long hairs protruding through small holes near the posterior edge of some of the scales. Pichis have well-developed claws on all four feet. The ears are short, and the eyes dark and relatively small.

Pichis have eight teeth on each side of the upper jaw, and nine on the lower. The absence of teeth on the premaxillary bone of the upper jaw is one of the features that allows them to be distinguished from other, similar, armadillos, such as the six-banded armadillo. Females have two teats, located in the chest region, and, like most armadillos, lack a true vagina, instead having a single urogenital sinus about 18 mm (0.71 in) in length. The male's penis is unusually long among mammals, being about 60% of the total body length.

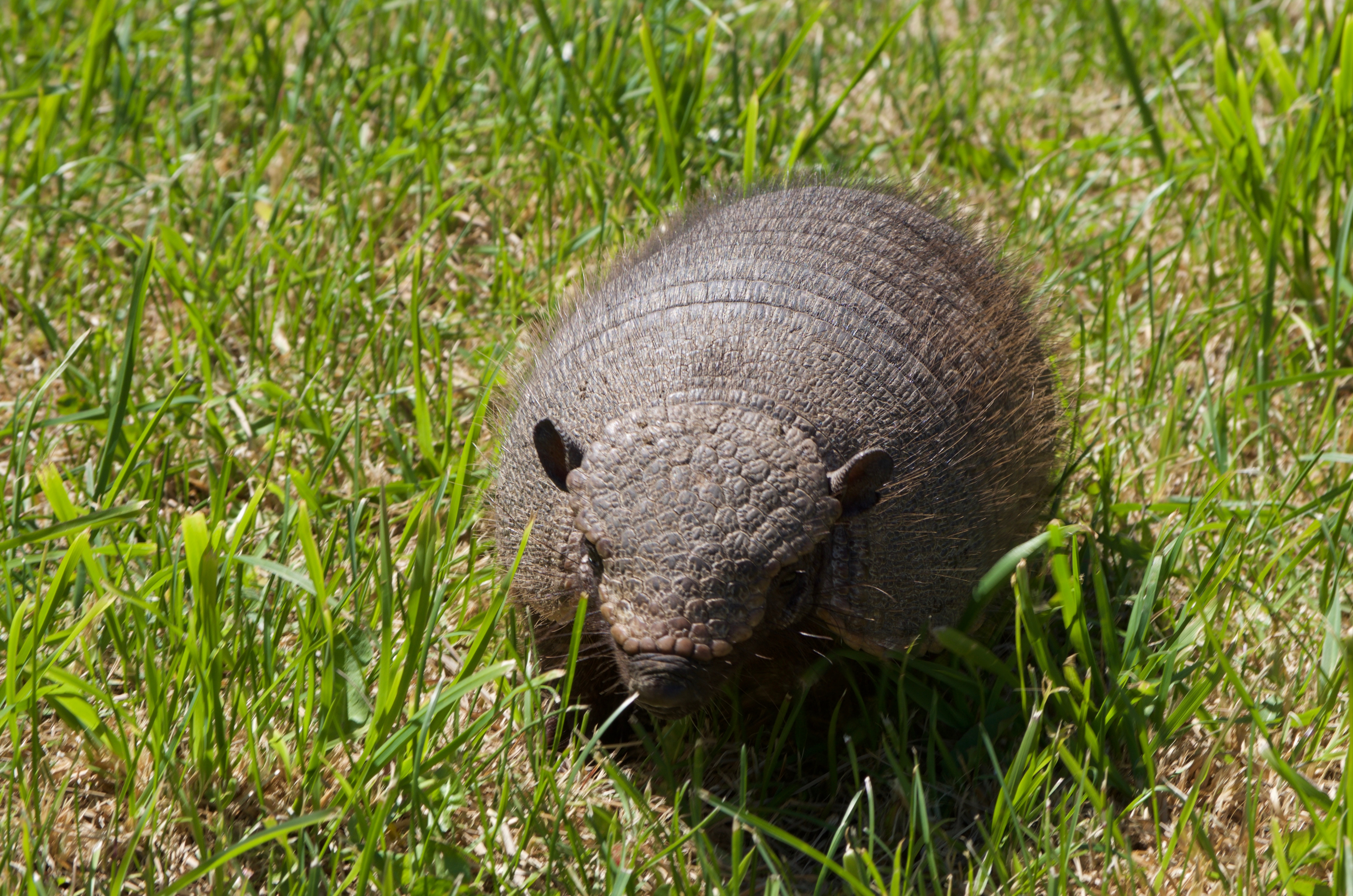
Pichi in the grass at Torres del Paine national park

== Distribution and habitat ==
Pichis are found from central and southern Argentina (Patagonia), west to the Andean grasslands of Chile, and south to the Strait of Magellan. Within this region, it most commonly inhabits arid or semiarid steppe grasslands, but may be found in other environments if they have sandy soils suitable for burrowing.

== Subspecies ==
- Zaedyus pichiy caurinus Thomas, 1928
- Zaedyus pichiy pichiy Desmarest, 1804

== Biology ==
Pichis are omnivorous, with the largest part of their diet consisting of invertebrates such as beetles, ants, and scorpions, though they will also eat small mammals or lizards, as well as plant material and fungi. Despite living in arid environments, they are not thought to drink water in the wild. Common predators include crowned eagles, buzzard-eagles, foxes, and cougars.

Pichis are the only armadillos known to hibernate. Like many hibernating animals, they build up considerable fat reserves before entering their winter burrows, where they remain from May to August. During hibernation, their body temperature drops from its normal value of about 35 °C (95 °F) to just 14 °C (57 °F). In addition to true hibernation, they also enter a period of daily torpor, lasting up to four hours each night, during which their body temperature can drop to as low as 24 °C (75 °F).

The breeding season lasts from spring to early summer, with the exact months depending on latitude. Females may be induced ovulators, and give birth to one or two young after a gestation period of 58 to 60 days, typically between October and January. The young are born with soft, pink skin with tiny osteoderms that begin to harden and turn more yellow after about two weeks. Newborn pichis weigh about 50 g (1.8 oz), and put on an average of 9 g (0.32 oz) per day until weaning ends at about 40 days and they leave the burrow for the first time.

== Behaviour ==
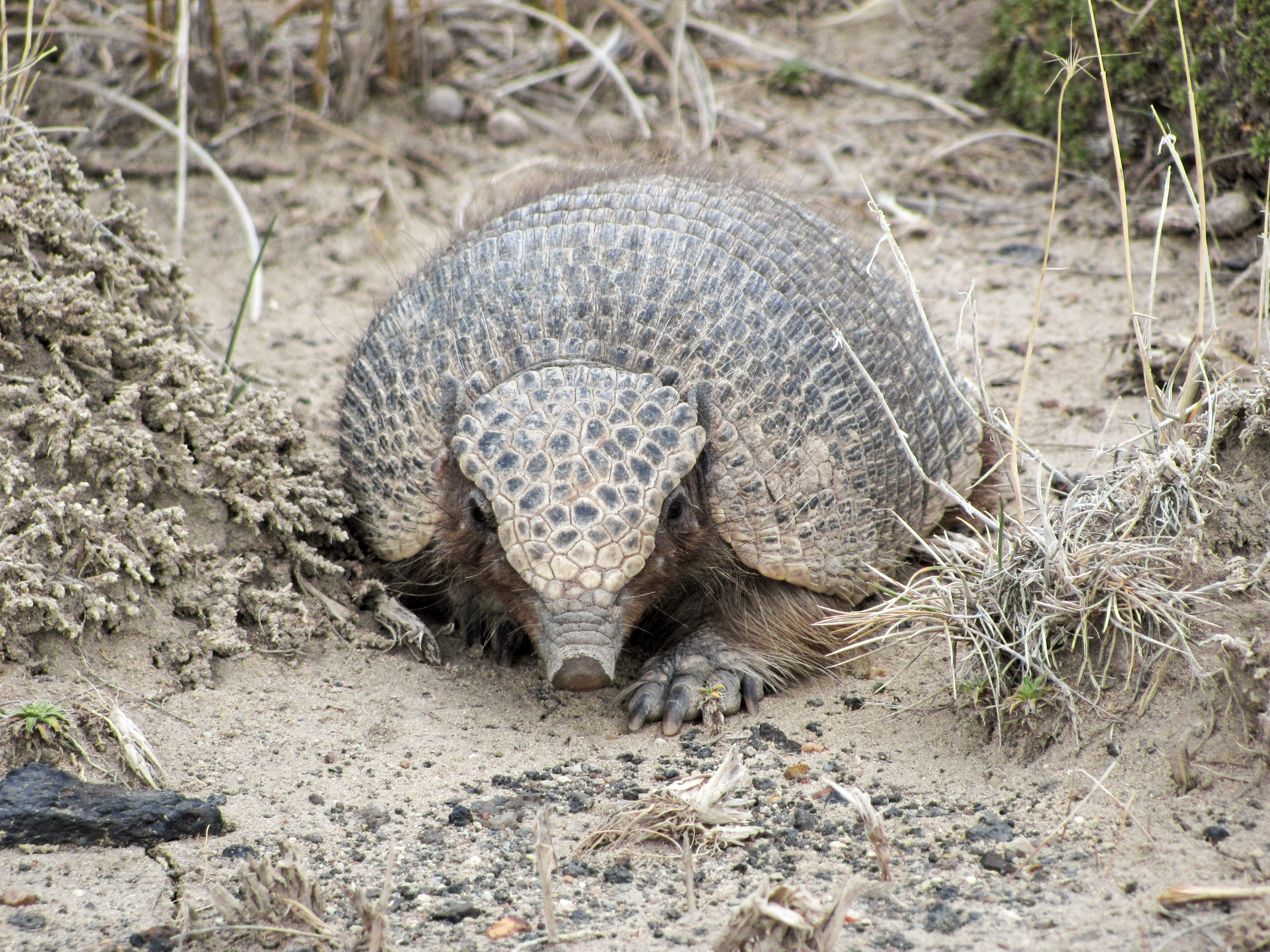
Pichi in Chubut Province (Argentina)

Pichis are solitary and diurnal. They dig burrows in sandy soil, which they use for shelter from extremes of weather. The burrows have a dome-shaped entrance and a single passage that can reach several metres in length, before terminating in a bare, unlined, resting chamber. They do not inhabit their burrows for extended periods, digging new ones at least every few weeks, and sometimes daily. During the winter, when the weather is more extreme, the burrows may be deeper than they are in the summer, reaching as much as 1.5 m (4 ft 11 in) below ground.

Pichis are solitary outside of the mating season. When threatened, they wedge themselves into their shallow burrow making it difficult for an attacker to drag them out because of their jagged scales, or else lie flat on the ground to protect their vulnerable belly. They have been reported to make both purring sounds and a loud grunt or scream.

== Conservation status ==
The IUCN has rated the conservation status of Z. pichiy as near-threatened. It is hunted for subsistence and sport, despite being protected in both Argentina and Chile. The armadillo is eaten and used in local handicrafts. Cattle ranching poses a threat to its habitat. Some populations have also been impacted by an unknown disease.
