= Carcharhinus egertoni =

Carcharhinus egertoni Temporal range: 23–2.59 Ma

Scientific classification
- Kingdom: Animalia
- Phylum: Chordata
- Class: Chondrichthyes
- Subclass: Elasmobranchii
- Division: Selachii
- Order: Carcharhiniformes
- Family: Carcharhinidae
- Genus: Carcharhinus
- Species: †C. egertoni

Binomial name
- †Carcharhinus egertoni (Agassiz, 1843)

Synonyms
- Glyphis egertoni (Agassiz, 1843); Prionodon egertoni Agassiz, 1843

Carcharhinus egertoni is an extinct species of requiem shark in the family Carcharhinidae. This shark falls under the genus Carcharhinus, putting it with other well-known sharks in its genus including reef sharks, the oceanic whitetip shark, and the bull shark. C. egertoni lived during the Neogene from 23 to 2.59 mya has been found to have occurred in all continents except Australia and Antartica.

== Occurrences ==
=== Miocene ===
- Calvert Formation, United States
- Pirabas Formation, Brazil
- Pisco Formation, Peru
- Camacho Formation, Uruguay
- Portugal
- Baripada Limestone, India
- Higashi-Innai Formation, Sekinobana Formation, Suso Formation, Hannoura Formation, Japan

=== Pliocene ===
- Onzole Formation, Ecuador
- Luanda Formation, Angola
- Villamagna Formation, Italy
