= Estudios Geológicos =

- Discipline: Geology
- Language: Spanish
- Edited by: Jose María Cebriá Gómez

Publication details
- History: 1929–present
- Publisher: Spanish National Research Council (CSIC) (Spain)
- Frequency: Biannual
- Open access: Yes
- Impact factor: 0.533 (2018)

Standard abbreviations
- ISO 4: Estud. Geol.

Indexing
- ISSN: 0367-0449 (print); 1988-3250 (web)

Links
- Journal homepage

Estudios Geológicos is a peer-reviewed open access scholarly journal publishing research articles and reviews in Earth Sciences. It is a journal operated by the Spanish National Research Council (CSIC), with the Geosciences Institute at the Complutense University of Madrid. The current executive editor is Jose María Cebriá Gómez.

== Abstracting and indexing ==
The journal is abstracted and indexed in:

- Biological Abstracts
- BIOSIS Previews
- DOAJ
- Essential Science Indicators
- GeoRef
- Science Citation Index Expanded
- Scopus
- Zoological Record
