= Ringueletia =

Ringueletia Temporal range: Miocene–Pleistocene

Scientific classification
- Kingdom: Animalia
- Phylum: Chordata
- Class: Mammalia
- Order: Cingulata
- Family: Dasypodidae
- Genus: †Ringueletia
- Species: †R. simpsoni

Binomial name
- †Ringueletia simpsoni Bordas, 1933

Extinct genus of cingulates

Ringueletia is an extinct genus of dasypodid cingulate that lived in South America during the Neogene and Quaternary periods.

== Palaeoecology ==
Scatological evidence in the form of coprolites indicates that the burrows of Ringueletia simpsoni were frequently taken over by the didelphid Thylophorops chapadmalensis and the procyonid Cyonasua lutaria. It is possible that both of these carnivores scavenged on R. simpsoni carcasses within such burrows.
