= Altiplano Basin =

Sedimentary basin within the Andes in Bolivia and Peru

- Cuenca del Altiplano
- Location within Bolivia

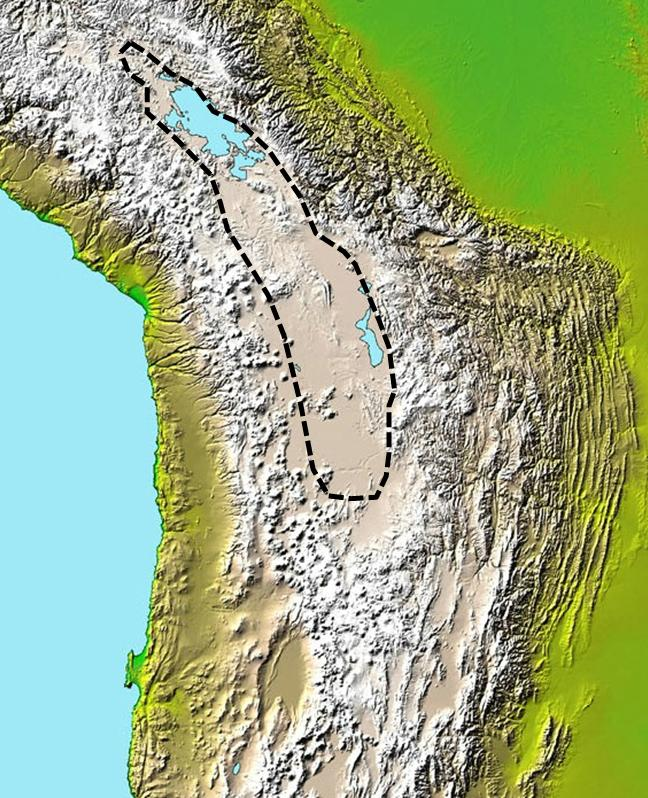
- DEM, showing the approximate area of the basin
- Coordinates: 18°28′S 67°20′W
- Etymology: Altiplano
- Region: Central Andes
- Country: Bolivia; Peru
- States: La Paz, Oruro, Potosí; Puno
- Cities: La Paz, Oruro, Potosí, Uyuni

Characteristics
- On/Offshore: Onshore
- Boundaries: Pasani Fault, Cordillera Occidental, Ayaviri Fault, Cordillera Oriental, Coniri Fault
- Part of: Intramontane Andean basins
- Area: 154,176 km^{2} (59,528 sq mi)

Hydrology
- River: Desaguadero River
- Lakes: Titicaca, Poopó

Geology
- Basin type: Piggy-back
- Plate: South American
- Orogeny: Andean
- Age: Early Paleozoic-Holocene
- Stratigraphy: Stratigraphy

The Altiplano Basin (Spanish: Cuenca del Altiplano) is a sedimentary basin within the Andes in Bolivia and Peru. The basin is located on the Altiplano plateau between the Cordillera Occidental and the Cordillera Oriental. Over-all the basin has evolved through time in a context of horizontal shortening of Earth's crust. The great thickness of the sediments accumulated in the basin is mostly the result of the erosion of Cordillera Oriental.

== Description ==
The Altiplano Basin has an approximate area of 154,176 square kilometres (59,528 sq mi). The northern part of the basin is overridden by the Cordillera Occidental along the Pasani Fault, a thrust fault. To the east, the northern part of the basin was overridden by the Cordillera Oriental along the Ayaviri Fault, another thrust fault albeit the fault is now buried under more recent sediments. Further south near Oruro and Sica Sica the boundary of the basin with the Cordillera Oriental block is made up by the largely buried Coniri Fault. The fault contact is not reflected in surface topography since Cordillera Oriental rises more than 10 kilometers to the east of Coniri Fault.

The sedimentation rate in the basin has varied strongly over geological time. In the time from the middle Paleocene to the middle Eocene on average less than 10 metres (33 ft) of sediments accumulated in the basin every million years. In the Late Eocene and Oligocene, sediments accumulated in the basin at a rate of up to 500 metres (1,600 ft) every million years. Similarly in the Miocene and Oligocene (15 to 30 million years ago) the Ayaviri Sub-basin in the north accumulated 110 to 660 metres (360 to 2,170 ft) of sediments every million years.

== Stratigraphy ==
The basin contains three large successions of sediments. The sedimentary sequence in the basin started in the Early Paleozoic. From bottom to top these are:

- Maastrichtian–Paleocene aged marine and non-marine sediments of the Santa Lucía and El Molino Formations. Their thickness is about 250 to 900 metres (820 to 2,950 ft).
- The 3,000-to-6,500-metre (9,800 to 21,300 ft) thick non-marine Potoco Formation. Most of the formation is of Eocene–Oligocene age.
- Sedimentary and volcanic rocks of Oligocene to Quaternary age making of a 1,000-to-4,000-metre (3,300 to 13,100 ft) thick pile.

It has been suggested that the northern part of the Altiplano Basin experienced a significant reverse fault movement in the Oligocene and Early Miocene (c. 28 to 16 million years ago).
