= Ischyrorhynchus =

Ischyrorhynchus Temporal range: 11.608–7.246 Ma Messinian

Scientific classification
- Kingdom: Animalia
- Phylum: Chordata
- Class: Mammalia
- Order: Artiodactyla
- Infraorder: Cetacea
- Family: Platanistidae
- Genus: †Ischyrorhynchus; Ameghino, 1891

Species
- †I. vanbenedeni (type) Ameghino, 1891

Synonyms
- Anisodelphis Rovereto, 1915

Extinct river dolphin

Ischyrorhynchus is an extinct genus of probable iniid river dolphins from South America. One species has been described, I. vanbenedeni.
