= Coscinocercus =

Coscinocercus Temporal range: Late Miocene ~9–7 Ma

Scientific classification
- Domain: Eukaryota
- Kingdom: Animalia
- Phylum: Chordata
- Class: Mammalia
- Order: Cingulata
- Family: Chlamyphoridae
- Subfamily: †Glyptodontinae
- Genus: †Coscinocercus; Cabrera, 1939

Species
- C. brachyurus Cabrera, 1939; C. marcalaini Cabrera, 1939

Extinct genus of mammals

Coscinocercus is an extinct genus of Glyptodont. It lived during the Late Miocene, and its fossilized remains were discovered in South America.

== Description ==
This animal, like all glyptodonts, had a carapace formed by numerous osteoderms fused together, protecting most of its body. Osteoderms from the dorsal carapace and the mobile rings of the tail show very numerous peripheral figures, among which were large perforations. The caudal tube was robust and its central figures were often separated by two rows of flat polygonal figures, with numerous perforations occupying the junction points of the furrows. Its appearance was probably quite similar to Plohophorus.

== Classification ==
The genus Coscinocercus was first described in 1939 by Cabrera, based on fossil remains found in the Argentine pampa, in Late Miocene terrains. Two species were attributed to this genus, Coscinocercus marcalaini and C. brachyurus, mainly distinguished by specificities of the carapace, that might only be intraspecific variations.

Coscinocercus was a member of the tribe Hoplophorini, a clade of glyptodonts. It was related to the genera Plohophorus and Phlyctaenopyga. Some evidences tends to suggest that it was synonymous with another Late Miocene genus, Pseudoplohophorus

== Bibliography ==
- Cabrera, A. 1939. Sobre vertebrados fósiles del Plioceno de Adolfo Alsina. Revista del Museo de La Plata 2: 3–35.
- Zetti, J. 1972. [Los Mamíferos fósiles de edad Huayqueriense (Plioceno Medio) de la Región Pampeana. Tesis Doctoral. Facultad de Ciencias Naturales y*Museo, Universidad Nacional de La Plata, La Plata, 86 p.].
