= Borhyaenidium =

Borhyaenidium Temporal range: Miocene–Pliocene

Scientific classification
- Kingdom: Animalia
- Phylum: Chordata
- Class: Mammalia
- Order: †Sparassodonta
- Family: †Hathliacynidae
- Genus: †Borhyaenidium; Pascual and Bocchino, 1963

Type species
- Borhyaenidium musteloides Pascual and Bocchino 1963

Other species
- Borhyaenidium altiplanicus Villarroel and Marshall, 1983; Borhyaenidium riggsi Marshall, 1981

Extinct genus of hathliacynid sparassodont

Borhyaenidium is an extinct genus of hathliacynid sparassodont that lived in South America during the Miocene and Pliocene epochs.

== Distribution ==
The type species, Borhyaenidium musteloides, inhabited Argentina, as did Borhyaenidium riggsi. Borhyaenidium altiplanicus lived in Bolivia.

== Description ==
B. altiplanicus had a significant diastema between P_{1} and P_{2} and a smaller one between P_{2} and P_{3}. The P_{2} was slightly longer mesiodistally than the P_{3}. The talonid of its M_{1} was unbasined and small. The talonid was larger on M_{2}, which also had a hypoconid and hypoconulid that were both larger than the diminished entoconid.
