= Ferigolomys =

Ferigolomys Temporal range: Late Miocene

Scientific classification
- Kingdom: Animalia
- Phylum: Chordata
- Class: Mammalia
- Infraclass: Placentalia
- Order: Rodentia
- Family: Dinomyidae
- Genus: †Ferigolomys; Kerber et al., 2017
- Species: †F. pacarana

Binomial name
- †Ferigolomys pacarana Kerber et al., 2017

Extinct genus of rodents

Ferigolomys is an extinct genus of dinomyid rodent that inhabited Brazil during the Late Miocene. It contains a single species, F. pacarana.
