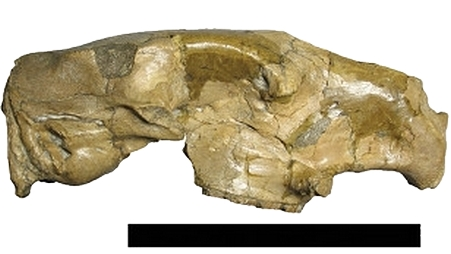
- Skull of Tetrastylus intermedius, taken 2022

Scientific classification
- Kingdom: Animalia
- Phylum: Chordata
- Class: Mammalia
- Order: Rodentia
- Family: Dinomyidae
- Genus: †Tetrastylus; Ameghino, 1886

Species
- Tetrastylus angustidens Rusconi, 1934 Tetrastylus araucanus Ameghino, 1904 Tetrastylus atrophiatus Rovereto, 1914 Tetrastylus intermedius Rovereto, 1914 Tetrastylus laevigatus Ameghino, 1886 Tetrastylus montanus Ameghino, 1891

= Tetrastylus =

Tetrastylus Temporal range: Miocene–Pleistocene

Extinct genus of rodent

Tetrastylus is an extinct genus of dinomyid rodent that lived in South America during the Neogene and Quaternary periods.

== Distribution ==
Tetrastylus is known from Argentina, Uruguay, Brazil, and Venezuela.

== Palaeobiology ==
=== Locomotion ===
Analysis of the occipitocervical morphology of Tetrastylus intermedius specimens from northwestern Argentina suggests that this species was a terrestrial animal, but it still retained some holdover traits related to arborealism from its evolutionary past, such as larger paracondyles relative to the modern pacarana and a size-proportionate head. It was less scansorial, however, than the extant Dinomys.
