= Ameghiniana =

- Discipline: Paleontology
- Language: English, Spanish
- Edited by: Darío Lazo

Publication details
- History: 1957–present
- Publisher: Asociación Paleontológica Argentina (Argentina)
- Frequency: Bimonthly
- Impact factor: 1.2 (2023)

Standard abbreviations
- ISO 4: Ameghiniana

Indexing
- ISSN: 0002-7014 (print); 1851-8044 (web)
- LCCN: 74645664
- OCLC no.: 63173355

Links
- Journal homepage

Ameghiniana is a peer-reviewed scientific journal covering palaeontology published by the Asociación Paleontológica Argentina. It is named after the 19th century Italian Argentine palaeontologist Florentino Ameghino. The discovery of many dinosaurs found in Argentina and South America have first been published in Ameghiniana; examples of this are Argentinosaurus and Herrerasaurus.

== Abstracting and indexing ==
The journal is abstracted and indexed in:

- Bibliography and Index of Geology
- Biological Abstracts
- Current Contents
- Geological Abstracts
- PASCAL
- Referativny Zhurnal
- Science Citation Index
- The Zoological Record
