= Andean Geology =

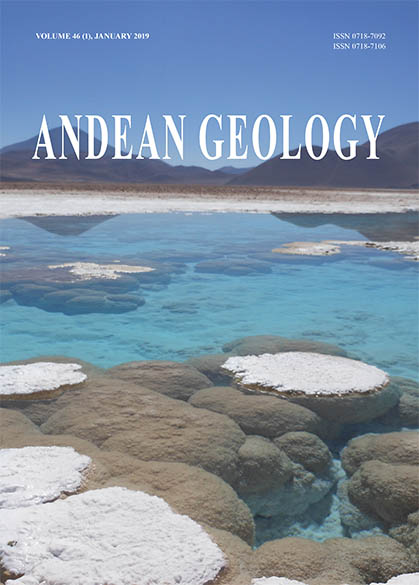
- Discipline: Geology, Earth sciences
- Language: English, Spanish
- Edited by: Daniel Bertin

Publication details
- Former name: Revista Geológica de Chile
- History: 1974–present
- Publisher: National Geology and Mining Service (Chile)
- Frequency: Triannually
- Open access: Yes
- License: Creative Commons Attribution License 4.0
- Impact factor: 2.368 (2021)

Standard abbreviations
- ISO 4: Andean Geol.

Indexing
- Andean Geology
- ISSN: 0718-7092 (print); 0718-7106 (web)
- LCCN: 2009255275
- Revista Geológica de Chile
- ISSN: 0716-0208 (print); 0717-618X (web)
- OCLC no.: 54108625

Links
- Journal homepage; Online access; Online archive; Journal page at SciELO

Andean Geology (formerly Revista Geológica de Chile) is a peer-reviewed scientific journal published three times per year by the National Geology and Mining Service, Chile's geology and mining agency. The journal covers the field of geology and related earth sciences, primarily on issues that are relevant to South America, Central America, and Antarctica with a particular focus on the Andes. The journal was established in 1974 and articles are published in English and Spanish. The editor-in-chief is Daniel Bertin (National Geology and Mining Service).

== Abstracting and indexing ==
The journal is abstracted and indexed in:

- Current Contents
- Science Citation Index Expanded
- Scopus
- Essential Science Indicators
- Directory of Open Access Journals
- Zoological Record

According to the Journal Citation Reports, the journal has a 2021 impact factor of 2.368.
