= List of extinct rodents =

This list is of rodent species that are extinct − no longer alive.

Species from related groups such as Lagomorpha (rabbits and hares) are not included.

== Before 1500 ==
Exceptionally large extinct rodents
Genus	Species	Notes	Location	Approx. max. weight	Stratigraphy	Image
Castor	C. californicus	An extinct beaver species	Western North America		Late Miocene to Early Pleistocene	
Castoroides		Giant beavers	North America	Up to 100 kg (220 lb)	Pleistocene	
Ceratogaulus		Horned gophers	North America	Smallest horned mammal	Late Miocene to Pliocene	
Spelaeomys	S. florensis	A large cave rat	Flores	-	Extinct by 1500	
"Giant hutias"		A paraphyletic group of rodents resembling large guinea pigs	West Indies	Up to 200 kg (440 lb)	Pleistocene	
Leithia		A giant dormouse	Europe (Malta, Sicily)	113 g (4.0 oz)	Pleistocene	
Neochoerus	N. pinckneyi	A large capybara	North America	100 kg (220 lb)	Pleistocene	
Josephoartigasia	J. monesi	'Giant pacarana', largest known rodent	South America	1,500 kg (3,300 lb)	Pliocene to Early Pleistocene	
Phoberomys	P. pattersoni	A horse-sized rodent	North America	Probably under 280 kg (620 lb); earlier estimates up to 700 kg (1,500 lb)	Miocene	
Telicomys		A giant rodent, to 2 metres (6 ft 7 in) long	South America	Perhaps 70% of size of P. pattersoni	Late Miocene to Early Pleistocene	

== Extinct after 1500 ==
=== 16th century ===
- Oriente cave rat
- Torre's cave rat
- Imposter hutia
- Montane hutia
- Megaoryzomys
- Cuban coney
- Hispaniolan edible rat
- Conilurus capricornensis
- Samaná hutia
- Buhler's coryphomys
- Noronhomys
- Pennatomys nivalis
- Desmarest's hutia

=== 17th century ===
- Insular cave rat
- Puerto Rican hutia
- Verhoeven's giant tree rat

== See also ==
- Extinct rodents – all periods
- Prehistoric rodents
- Rodent extinctions since 1500
