= Matthew Borths =

American vertebrate palaeontologist

Matthew Robert Borths
- Citizenship: American
- Known for: Palaeoprimatology and hyaenodontology
- Scientific career
- Fields: Vertebrate palaeontology
- Doctoral advisor: Erik Seiffert

Matthew Robert Borths is an American vertebrate palaeontologist. He specialises in studying Cenozoic mammals from Afro-Arabia, particularly hyaenodonts.

== Career ==
Borths obtained Bachelor of Science degrees in Geological Sciences and Anthropology from Ohio State University in 2008. He earned his doctorate at Stony Brook University under the tutelage of his advisor Erik Seiffert. He currently works as the Curator of Fossil Primates at the Duke Lemur Center.

Below is a list of taxa that Borths has contributed to naming:

Year	Taxon	Authors
2026	Peruchinchilla prima gen. et sp. nov.	Arnal, Kay, Valdivia, Salenbien, Morse, Borths, Williams, Riddle, Martínez, & Gonzalez
2026	Matsigenkamys ericius gen. et sp. nov.	Arnal, Kay, Valdivia, Salenbien, Morse, Borths, Williams, Riddle, Martínez, & Gonzalez
2026	Marianamys altadens gen. et sp. nov.	Arnal, Kay, Valdivia, Salenbien, Morse, Borths, Williams, Riddle, Martínez, & Gonzalez
2026	Manumys materdei gen. et sp. nov.	Arnal, Kay, Valdivia, Salenbien, Morse, Borths, Williams, Riddle, Martínez, & Gonzalez
2026	Atalayamys incertum gen. et sp. nov.	Arnal, Kay, Valdivia, Salenbien, Morse, Borths, Williams, Riddle, Martínez, & Gonzalez
2026	Ricardomys antiqua sp. nov.	Arnal, Kay, Valdivia, Salenbien, Morse, Borths, Williams, Riddle, Martínez, & Gonzalez
2026	Luantus silbamanta sp. nov.	Arnal, Kay, Valdivia, Salenbien, Morse, Borths, Williams, Riddle, Martínez, & Gonzalez
2026	Acarechimys manumanta sp. nov.	Arnal, Kay, Valdivia, Salenbien, Morse, Borths, Williams, Riddle, Martínez, & Gonzalez
2019	Simbakubwa kutokaafrika gen. et sp. nov.	Borths & Stevens
2017	Pakakali rukwaensis gen. et sp. nov.	Borths & Stevens
2017	Masrasector nananubis sp. nov.	Borths & Seiffert
2016	Brychotherium ephalmos gen. et sp. nov.	Borths, Holroyd, & Seiffert
2016	Akhnatenavus nefertiticyon sp. nov.	Borths, Holroyd, & Seiffert
2015	Kerberos langebadreae gen. et sp. nov.	Solé, Amson, Borths, Vidalenc, Morlo, & Bastl
