= Raigón Formation =

Geologic formation in Uruguay

- Stratigraphic range: Pliocene–Middle Pleistocene
- Type: Geological formation
- Underlies: Libertad Formation
- Overlies: Fray Bentos Formation

Lithology
- Primary: siltstone

Location
- Country: Uruguay

Type section
- Named for: Raigón, Uruguay
- Raigón Formation, Uruguay

The Raigón Formation is a geologic formation in Uruguay dated between the Pliocene and Middle Pleistocene.

== Overview ==
In 1966, Uruguayan geologists Héctor Goso and Jorge Bossi defined the Raigón Formation, which they subdivided into the San José Member (the same as Francis and Mones' San José Formation) below and the San Bautista Member above. In 1988, Álvaro Mones identified Lower Pleistocene levels in the San José Member. In 2002, American geologist H. McDonald and Uruguayan paleontologist Daniel Perea suggested the formation may represent a wide timespan from the Montehermosan all the way to the Ensenadan.

A notable finding was J. monesi, recovered in situ from a boulder originating in the San José Member. The boulder is made up of siltstone, claystone, and medium-grained and medium-to-conglomeratic psammite (a type of sandstone) intercalated with siltstone.

== Fossil content ==
The following fossils have been reported from the formation:

- Charruatoxodon
- Desmodus draculae
- Trigodon sp.
- Catonyx tarijensis
- Pronothrotherium figueirasi
- Glyptodon
- Plaxhaplous
- Giganhinga
- Josephoartigasia monesi
- Pronothrotherium
- Uruguayurus
- Cardiatherium talicei
- Uruguayodon
- Platygonus sp.
- Phorusrhacinae (possibly Devincenzia)
- Homotherini - previously assigned to cf. Xenosmilus sp., but its generic attribution is uncertain. But more recent studies reaffirm its classification to Xenosmilus.

== See also ==
- List of fossiliferous stratigraphic units in Uruguay
