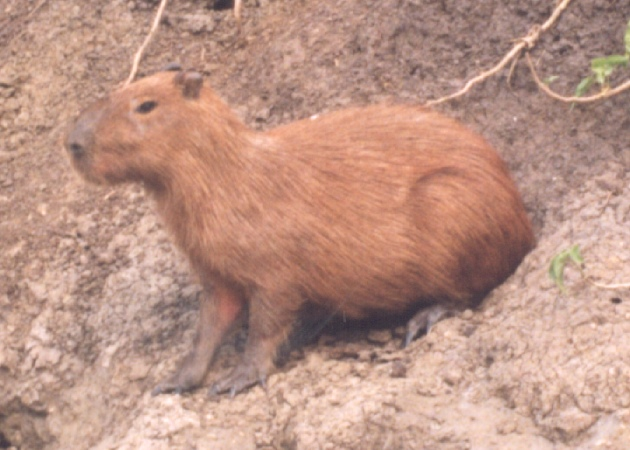
- Capybara

Scientific classification
- Kingdom: Animalia
- Phylum: Chordata
- Class: Mammalia
- Order: Rodentia
- Infraorder: Hystricognathi
- Parvorder: Caviomorpha; Wood, 1955

Families
- see text

Synonyms
- Neocaviomorpha

= Caviomorpha =

Caviomorpha Temporal range: Oligocene–Recent

Sub-set of rodents in South America

Caviomorpha is the rodent parvorder that unites all New World hystricognaths. It is supported by both fossil and molecular evidence. The Caviomorpha was for a time considered to be a separate order outside the Rodentia, but is now accepted as a genuine part of the rodents. Caviomorphs include the extinct Heptaxodontidae (giant hutias), the extinct Josephoartigasia monesi (the largest rodent ever known) and extant families of chinchilla rats, hutias, guinea pigs and the capybara, chinchillas and viscachas, tuco-tucos, agoutis, pacas, pacaranas, spiny rats, New World porcupines, coypu and octodonts (Vassallo and Antenucci, 2015).

== Origin ==
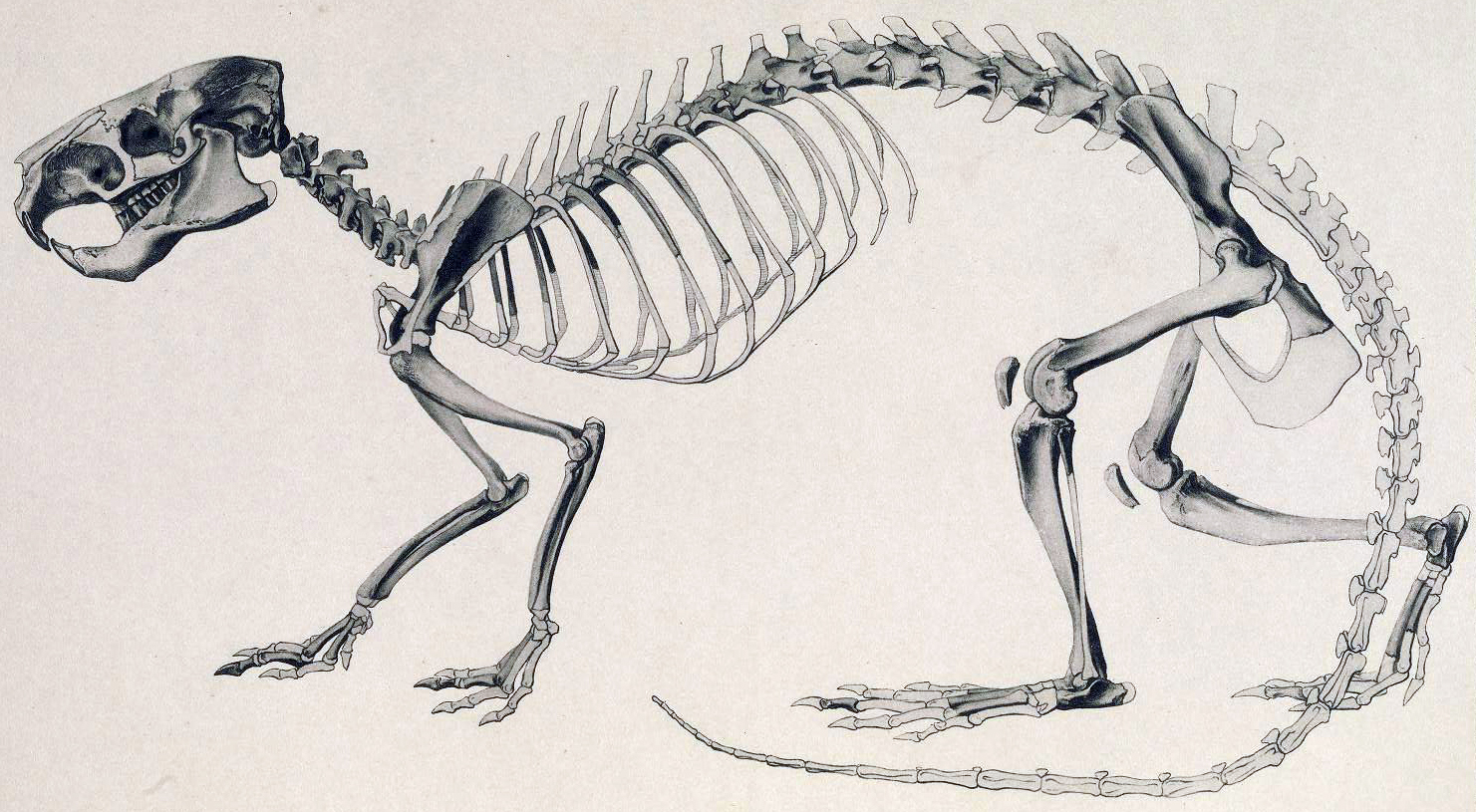
Neoreomys

The first known rodent fossils in South America are represented by the three taxa Cachiyacuy contamanensis, C. kummeli, and Canaanimys maquiensis, as well as teeth from Eobranisamys sp. (Dasyproctidae) and Eospina sp., the latter two found also in the Santa Rosa fauna from the late Eocene or early Oligocene. By the late Oligocene, all superfamilies and most families of caviomorphs are present in the fossil record.

During this time, South America was isolated from all other continents. Several hypotheses have been proposed as to how hystricognath rodents colonized this island continent. Most require that a small group of these rodents traveled across ocean bodies atop a raft of mangroves or driftwood.

The most common hypothesis suggests that the ancestor to all modern caviomorphs rafted across the Atlantic Ocean (then narrower) from Africa (Lavocat, 1969; Huchon and Douzery, 2000). This is supported by molecular results, which suggest that the Phiomorpha (as restricted to Bathyergidae, Petromuridae, and Thryonomyidae) are sister taxa to the Caviomorpha. All modern hystricognath families are restricted to South America, Africa, or had a range that included Africa (Hystricidae). New World monkeys appear to have colonized South America from Africa at a similar time.

Caviomorphs went on to colonize the West Indies as far as the Bahamas, reaching the Greater Antilles by the early Oligocene. This is commonly viewed as another example of oceanic dispersal, although a role for a possible land bridge has also been considered.

== Diversity ==
Caviomorph rodents underwent an explosive diversification upon arrival into South America. They managed to outcompete other animals in rodent-like niches such as certain South American marsupials. Retaining predominantly herbivorous diets, they expanded their sizes to encompass a range from rat-sized echimyids to the bison-sized Phoberomys. Their ecologies included burrowing gopher-like forms such as tuco-tucos, arboreal forms such as porcupines and certain spiny rats, running forms such as maras, and aquatic forms such as the capybara and nutria (Vassallo and Antenucci, 2015). Habitats include grasslands (maras), high mountains (chinchillas and chinchilla rats), forest edges (prehensile-tailed porcupines) and dense tropical forests (pacas and acouchis).

Although many species of caviomorphs have migrated into Central America since the Great American Interchange, only a single living species, the North American porcupine, has naturally colonized North America north of Mexico (the extinct capybara Neochoerus pinckneyi also accomplished this feat). The nutria has been introduced into North America and has proven a highly successful invasive species there.

== Families ==
- Parvorder Caviomorpha – New World hystricognaths
  - †Atalayamys – incertae sedis
  - †Luribayomys – incertae sedis
  - Superfamily Cavioidea
    - Caviidae – cavies, capybaras, and maras
    - Cuniculidae – pacas
    - Dasyproctidae – agoutis and acouchis
    - †Eocardiidae
    - †Guiomys
    - †Luantus
    - †Neoepiblemidae
    - †Scotamys
  - Superfamily Chinchilloidea
    - †Borikenomys – incertae sedis
    - Chinchillidae – chinchillas and viscachas
    - Dinomyidae – pacaranas
    - †Heptaxodontidae – giant hutias
    - †Manumys – incertae sedis
    - †Maquiamys – incertae sedis
    - †Marianamys – incertae sedis
    - †Tsaphanomys – incertae sedis
  - Superfamily Erethizontoidea
    - Family Erethizontidae – New World porcupines
  - Superfamily Octodontoidea
    - †Acarechimys – incertae sedis
    - Abrocomidae – chinchilla rats
    - †Caviocricetus – incertae sedis
    - Ctenomyidae – tuco-tucos
    - †Dicolpomys – incertae sedis
    - Echimyidae – spiny rats, coypus, and hutias
    - †Morenella – incertae sedis
    - Octodontidae – degus and relatives
    - †Plateomys – incertae sedis
    - †Tainotherium Turvey, Grady & Rye, 2006 – incertae sedis

== See also ==
- Phiomorpha
- Hystricomorpha
- Hystricognathi
