= Comaphorus =

Comaphorus Temporal range: Late Miocene ~9–7 Ma

Scientific classification
- Kingdom: Animalia
- Phylum: Chordata
- Class: Mammalia
- Order: Cingulata
- Family: Chlamyphoridae
- Subfamily: †Glyptodontinae
- Genus: †Comaphorus; Ameghino, 1886

Type species
- Comaphorus concisus Ameghino, 1886

Extinct genus of mammals

Comaphorus is a dubious extinct genus of glyptodont. It lived during the Late Miocene in Argentina, but only one fossil has ever been referred to the animal.

== Description ==
This genus is only known from only a single dorsal carapace osteoderm that has since been lost. Like all glyptodonts, it probably had a large dorsal carapace made of fused osteoderms. Ameghino diagnosed the taxon based on very general characteristics, such as the dorsal surface being raised in the center, bearing twenty perforations lost in the thickness of the osteoderm that didn’t lead to similar perforations present on the internal surface. These characters are very vague and due to the holotype being missing, the taxon is still a nomen dubium. Based on its phylogenetic position in Doedicurinae, Comaphorus likely was one of the larger known glyptodonts with a robust, fused tail sheath.

== History and classification ==
Comaphorus concisus was first described in 1886 by Florentino Ameghino, based on a single dorsal carapace osteoderm that had been collected from the Upper Miocene strata of the Ituzaingo Formation in Entre Rios Province, Argentina. Ameghino believed that the genus was closely related to the Pleistocene genus Doedicurus and Plaxhaplous, two genera that have since been classified in the tribe Doedicurini along with Eleutherocercus. However, the type osteoderm has since been lost and the diagnostic features used by Ameghino have been observed in several other glyptodonts and are not specific, making this taxon a nomen dubium. Despite this, the osteoderm’s features still indicate that it was a close relative of Doedicurus and other doedicurines.
