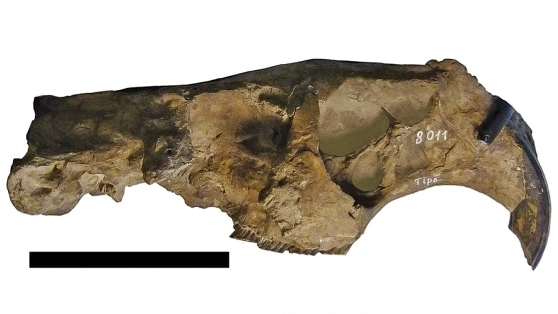
- Telicomys giganteus

Scientific classification
- Kingdom: Animalia
- Phylum: Chordata
- Class: Mammalia
- Order: Rodentia
- Family: Dinomyidae
- Genus: †Telicomys; Kraglievich, 1926

Species
- Telicomys giganteus Telicomys gigantissimus Telicomys amazonensis (disputed)

= Telicomys =

Telicomys Temporal range: Late Miocene (Mayoan-Huayquerian) ~11.608–7.246 Ma

Extinct genus of rodents

Telicomys is an extinct genus of rodent from the Solimões Formation, Brazil, South America.

== Description ==
This rodent weighed approximately 200–500 kg (440–1,100 lb). With a length of more than 2 metres (6 ft 7 in) in T. gigantissimus, it contains two or three of the largest rodents that ever lived, along with Phoberomys, Josephoartigasia, and the giant beaver. It is part of the same South American radiation of rodents as both Phoberomys and the modern capybara, which is the largest living rodent, reaching lengths of up to 1.35 m (4 ft 5 in). The closest living relative to Telicomys is the pacarana. Its name derives from Greek τηλικος + μυς = "a mouse [= rodent] of such a size".

== Palaeobiology ==
Depending on the technique used to produce estimates, the bite force of T. giganteus has been reconstructed as being 500-1,000 N at the incisors, with some methods recovering a bite force as high as 2,000 N. It is believed that this powerful bite was used as a defence against potential predators.
