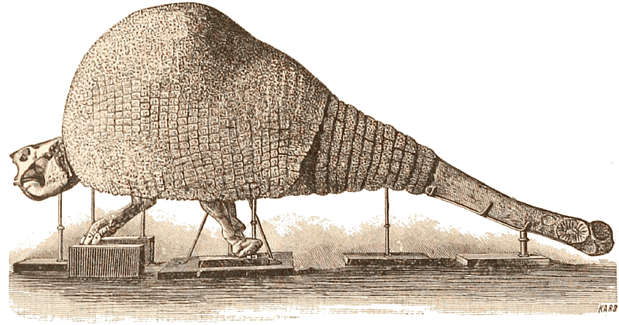
- Illustration of a skeleton

Scientific classification
- Kingdom: Animalia
- Phylum: Chordata
- Class: Mammalia
- Order: Cingulata
- Family: Chlamyphoridae
- Subfamily: †Glyptodontinae
- Genus: †Doedicurus; Burmeister, 1874
- Species: †D. clavicaudatus

Binomial name
- †Doedicurus clavicaudatus Owen, 1847

Synonyms
- List: Glyptodon clavicaudatus Owen, 1847; Hoplophorus clavicaudatus Nodot, 1857; Glyptodon giganteus Serres, 1866; Panochthus giganteus Burmeister, 1874; Doedicurus giganteus Burmeister, 1874; Doedicurus uruguayanesis Gervais and Ameghino, 1847; Doedicurus gigas Ameghino, 1847

= Doedicurus =

Doedicurus Temporal range: Pleistocene-Holocene (Marplatan-Lujanian) 2–0.007 Ma

Extinct genus of glyptodont

Doedicurus, from Ancient Greek δοῖδυξ (doîdux), meaning "pestle" and oυρά (ourá), meaning "tail", is an extinct genus of glyptodont from South America containing one species, D. clavicaudatus. Glyptodonts are a member of the family Chlamyphoridae, which also includes some modern armadillo species, and they are classified in the superorder Xenarthra alongside sloths and anteaters. Being a glyptodont, it was a rotund animal with heavy armor and a carapace. Averaging at an approximate 1,400 kg (3,100 lb), it was one of the largest glyptodonts to have ever lived. Though glyptodonts were quadrupeds, large ones like Doedicurus may have been able to stand on two legs like other xenarthrans. It notably sported a spiked tail club, which may have weighed 40 or 65 kg (88 or 143 lb) in life, and it may have swung this in defense against predators or in fights with other Doedicurus at speeds of perhaps 11 m/s (40 km/h; 25 mph).

Doedicurus was likely a grazer, but its teeth and mouth, like those of other glyptodonts, seem unable to have chewed grass effectively, which may indicate a slow metabolism. Doedicurus existed during the Pleistocene. Before this, South America had been isolated from the rest of the world, but the formation of the Isthmus of Panama allowed North American fauna to invade South America in the Great American Interchange, including big cats, bears, proboscideans, camelids, and horses. Doedicurus seems to have inhabited the relatively cold and humid Chaco-Pampean plains of northeastern Patagonia. It may have been the latest-surviving glyptodont, with remains suggested to date to 8,000–7,000 years ago during the middle Holocene, though these dates have been questioned. It may have gone extinct due to some combination of human hunting and climate change.

== Taxonomy and evolution ==
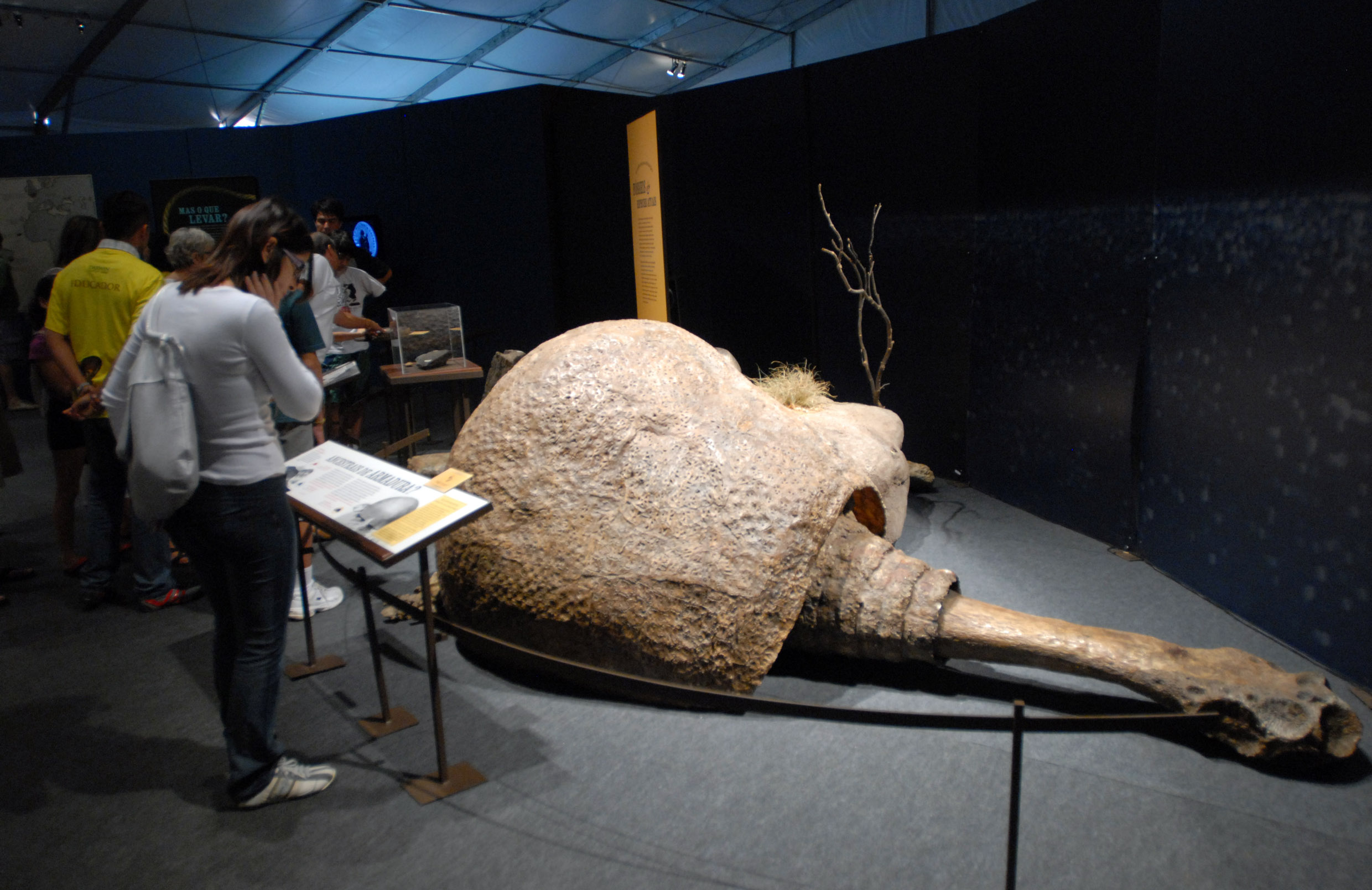
Doedicurus fossil in Brazil

The animal was first described by British paleontologist Richard Owen in 1847, the fifth glyptodont species described after Glyptodon clavipes, G. reticulatus, G. tuberculatus (now Panochthus), and G. ornatus (now Neosclerocalyptus). The type specimen was a partial tail which seemed to indicate a massive club, so Owen assigned the name G. clavicaudatus (the species name deriving from Latin meaning "club-tailed"). In 1874, German zoologist Hermann Burmeister classified it into its own genus as Doedicurus clavicaudatus, the genus name deriving from Ancient Greek δοῖδυξ "pestle" and oυρά "tail".

Doedicurus was a glyptodont, most closely related to modern armadillos, thus a member of the superorder Xenarthra (along with sloths and anteaters) endemic to South America. Glyptodonts were classified into the family Glyptodontidae. Through the 19th and 20th centuries, new species and genera were described on the basis of minute or debatable differences, and the total diversity had reached 65 genera with 220 species. In 1997, Malcolm C. McKenna and Susan K. Bell in their comprehensive revision of mammal taxonomy assigned all glyptodonts to the superfamily Glyptodontoidea, which included the families Pampatheriidae, Palaeopeltidae, and Glyptodontidae. Doedicurus was classified into Glyptodontidae in the subfamily Doedicurinae, alongside Eleutherocercus, Prodaedicurus, Comaphorus, Castellanosia, Xiphuroides, Daedicuroides, and Plaxhaplous.

In 2016, ancient DNA was extracted from the carapace of a 12,000 year old Doedicurus specimen, and a nearly complete mitochondrial genome was reconstructed (76x coverage). Comparisons with those of modern armadillos revealed that glyptodonts diverged from tolypeutine and chlamyphorine armadillos approximately 34 million years ago in the late Eocene. This prompted moving them from their own family, Glyptodontidae, to the subfamily Glyptodontinae within the extant Chlamyphoridae. Based on this and the fossil record, glyptodonts would have evolved their characteristic shape and large size (gigantism) quite rapidly, possibly in response to the cooling, drying climate and expansion of open savannas.

Cladogram of glyptodonts after Barasoain et al. 2022:

- Glyptodonts
  - Traditional Glyptodontinae
    - Boreostemma
    - - Glyptotherium
      - Glyptodon
  - "Austral clade"
    - Propalaehoplophorus
    - - Eucinepeltus
      - - Cochlops
        - Palaehoplophorus
        - - Kelenkura
          - - Eosclerocalyptus
            - - - - Plohophorus
                  - Pseudohoplophorus
                - Doedicurinae
                  - Doedicurus
                  - Eleutherocercus
              - - Neosclerocalyptus
                - Hoplophorini
                  - Hoplophorus
                  - - Propanochthus
                    - Panochthus

== Description ==
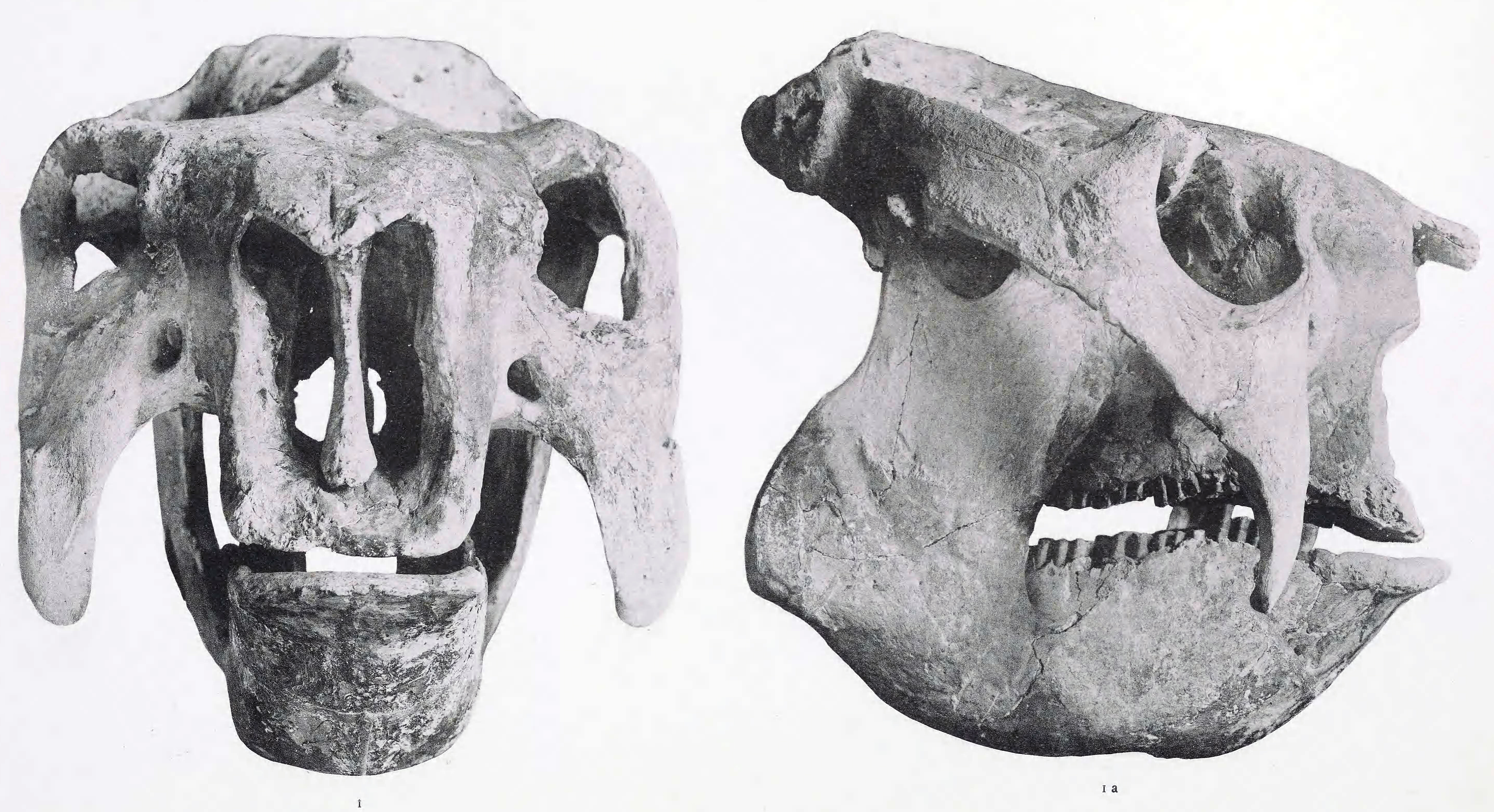
Skull of Doedicurus from the front and right

=== Teeth ===
Glyptodonts have hypsodont dentition, and the teeth also never stopped growing in life, so they are assumed to have fed predominantly on grass. However, they have unusual teeth compared to those of other mammals, featuring three lobes (except for the first two teeth, which have the usual two lobes). The tooth core is made of osteodentine, which is surrounded by a layer of orthodentine, and capped off by cementum instead of enamel. Some of the orthodentine became exposed over time as the cementum was worn away, producing a file-like surface to better process grass, similar to the hard dentine and cementum eventually protruding through the enamel of horse and cattle teeth.

Glyptodonts have eight cheek teeth, and, like bovines, completely lack canines and incisors. Nonetheless, Doedicurus and other large glyptodonts appear to have had a markedly reduced gape, and the teeth have relatively small grinding surfaces, which indicate they were incapable of thoroughly chewing food. This may have been caused by the increasing size of the muscles to support the head and neck as the armor in this region became heavier and heavier, displacing the chewing muscles to less mechanically efficient positions. This is odd as thoroughly grinding grass is very important in maximizing nutrient absorption, and such inefficiency could indicate a slow metabolism. The apparently strong tongue may have partially reworked and pushed incompletely chewed food into the stomach or possibly a cecum.

=== Body ===
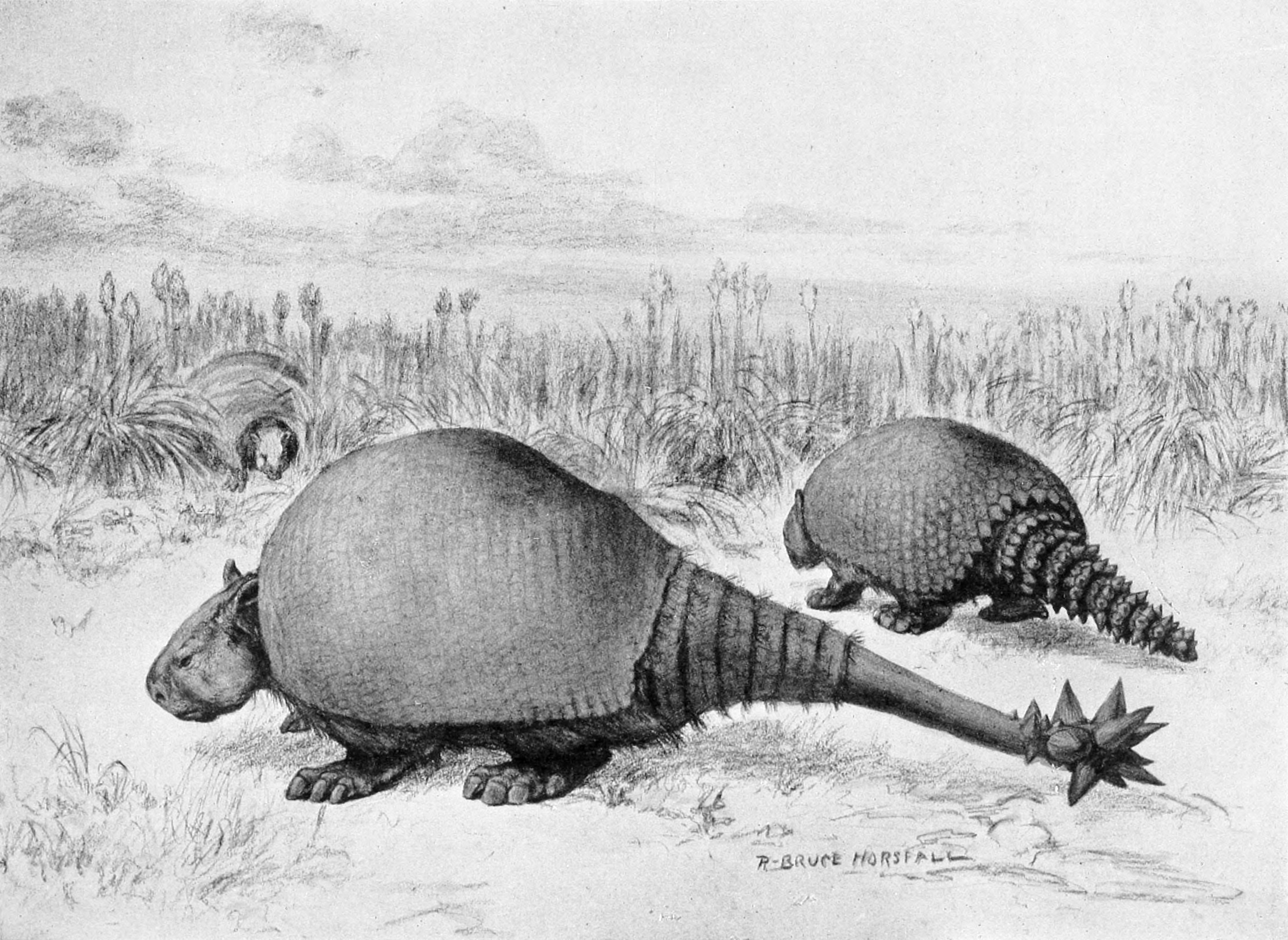
1913 reconstruction of Doedicurus and Glyptodon by Robert Bruce Horsfall

Doedicurus, on average, had a height of 1.5 m (4 ft 11 in), an overall length of around 3.6 m (12 ft), and a weight of about 1,400 kg (3,100 lb), but an 8,000 year old specimen was calculated to have been 1,900 to 2,370 kg (4,190 to 5,220 lb), which could indicate Doedicurus grew much larger in the Holocene just before going extinct. This makes it one of the heaviest glyptodont species known, alongside Pa. intermedius, Pa. subintermedius, G. munizi, G. elongatus, and Plaxhaplous. Doedicurus had a huge domed carapace that was made of many tightly fitted scutes, somewhat similar to that of its modern-day relative, the armadillos. The carapace was firmly anchored to the pelvis but loose around the shoulder. The carapace featured a dome, which may have been a fat-filled space, similar to a camel's hump.

=== Tail ===
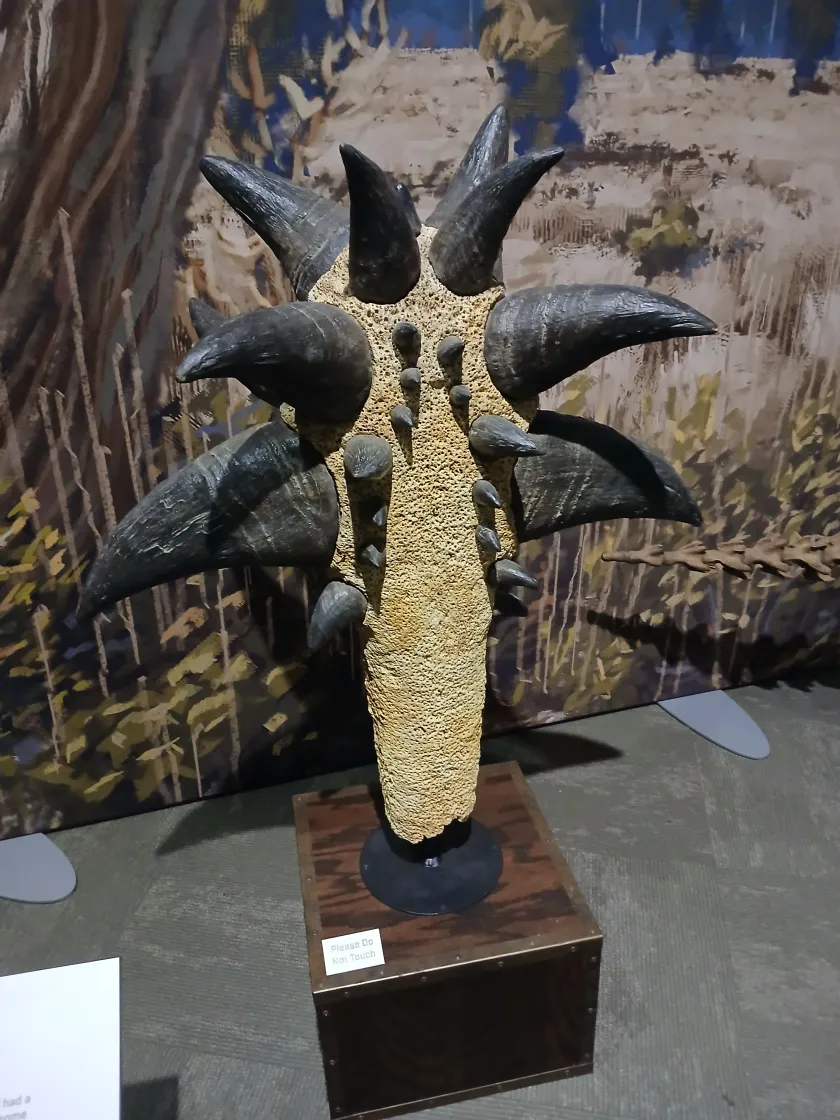
A museum display showing the club at the end of the tail of Doedicurus

Its tail was surrounded by a flexible sheath of bone, and features shallow depressions along the edges, which may have been spikes in life. The tail club could reach up to 1 m (3 ft 3 in) in length. Assuming a maximum strain of 0.25 (typical for vertebrates), stress exertion of 3 × 10^{5} N m^{−2} (based on what is measured in the muscles of recently dead animals), and a volume of 100 L (22 imp gal; 26 US gal) for the tail muscle, Doedicurus may have been capable of delivering a blow of about 2.5 kJ (1,800 ft⋅lbf), though this may be an underestimate. Assuming a total mass of 40 kg (88 lb) in life for the club, this would equate to a maximum velocity of 11 m/s (40 km/h; 25 mph). (Note: The calculated speed is based on the assumption that the club is a point mass—the entire mass was effectively summed down to a single point—which is an inaccurate representation.) The tip of the tail may have reached 15 m/s (54 km/h; 34 mph). Assuming the club was 65 kg (143 lb) in life, the center of percussion (the point of impact on the club which would have exerted maximum force and minimized damage done to itself) would have been about 77 cm (2.5 ft) from the tip.

=== Limbs ===
As with other glyptodonts and xenarthrans, the center of mass appears to have been closer to the hind limbs than the forelimbs, indicating the vast majority and in some instance nearly all of the weight was borne on the hind limbs. This might show that glyptodonts, when their weight was displaced farther tailwards, could stand on two legs, though not necessarily maintaining an erect posture. Modern xenarthrans commonly stand up in this fashion for defense, to observe, or to feed. Strong hind limbs would also have been important while accelerating the tail club and maintaining posture after getting hit.

Nonetheless, glyptodonts also had powerful forearms. Because the forelimbs did not need to bear weight, it is possible that they dug much like modern armadillos, but the carapace and spine were much more rigid than those of armadillos. Alternatively, the forelimbs may have been engaged while rotating the body to swing the tail club. Because earlier, smaller glyptodonts do not share similar weight distribution, the adoption of a bipedal stance may be related to increasing body size.

== Paleobiology ==
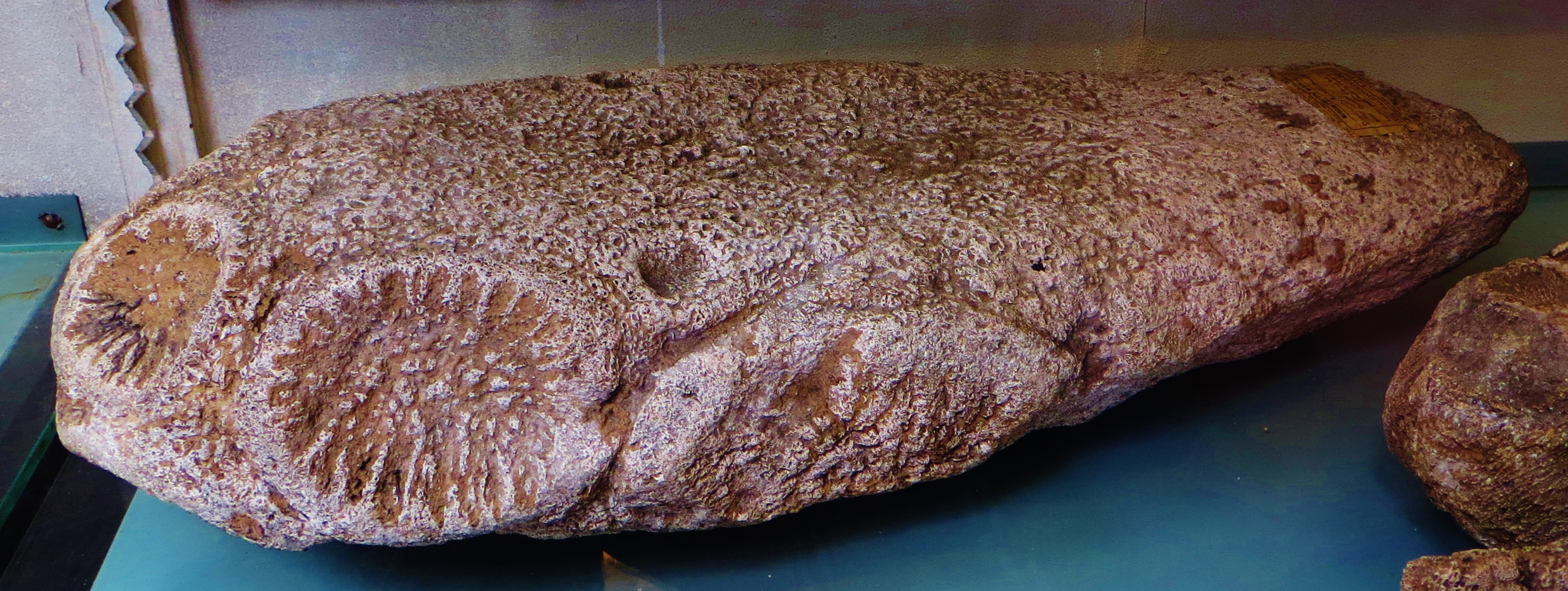
The depressions on the tail club may have supported spikes

Doedicurus is thought to have been a grazer, and the high degree of hypsodonty and the breadth of the muzzle could indicate it was a bulk feeder.

Glyptodont species notably increased in size after the Great American Interchange and immigration of new mammals into the previously isolated continent, with some of the largest glyptodonts, including Doedicurus, being known from the Pleistocene following this event. This may indicate increasing gigantism was an anti-predator adaptation in response to new mammalian carnivores. There is evidence that Smilodon preyed upon Doedicurus. In the Late Pleistocene and Holocene, size dramatically increased, perhaps in response to a cooling climate (which would have reduced its metabolism, causing an increase in size) or to defend against recently immigrating human hunters.

However, the increase in armor and body mass might instead have been driven primarily by intraspecific competition in fights between Doedicurus individuals. If so, males would probably have been much more heavily built than females. Evidence of carapace fractures consistent with the force calculated for a tail club impact has been noted. The eyesight of Doedicurus may have been too poor for use of the tail club in predator defense. The accuracy needed to strike a target with the club may only have been attainable with a stationary adversary, further supporting use in ritualistic combat rather than predator defense.

== Paleoecology ==
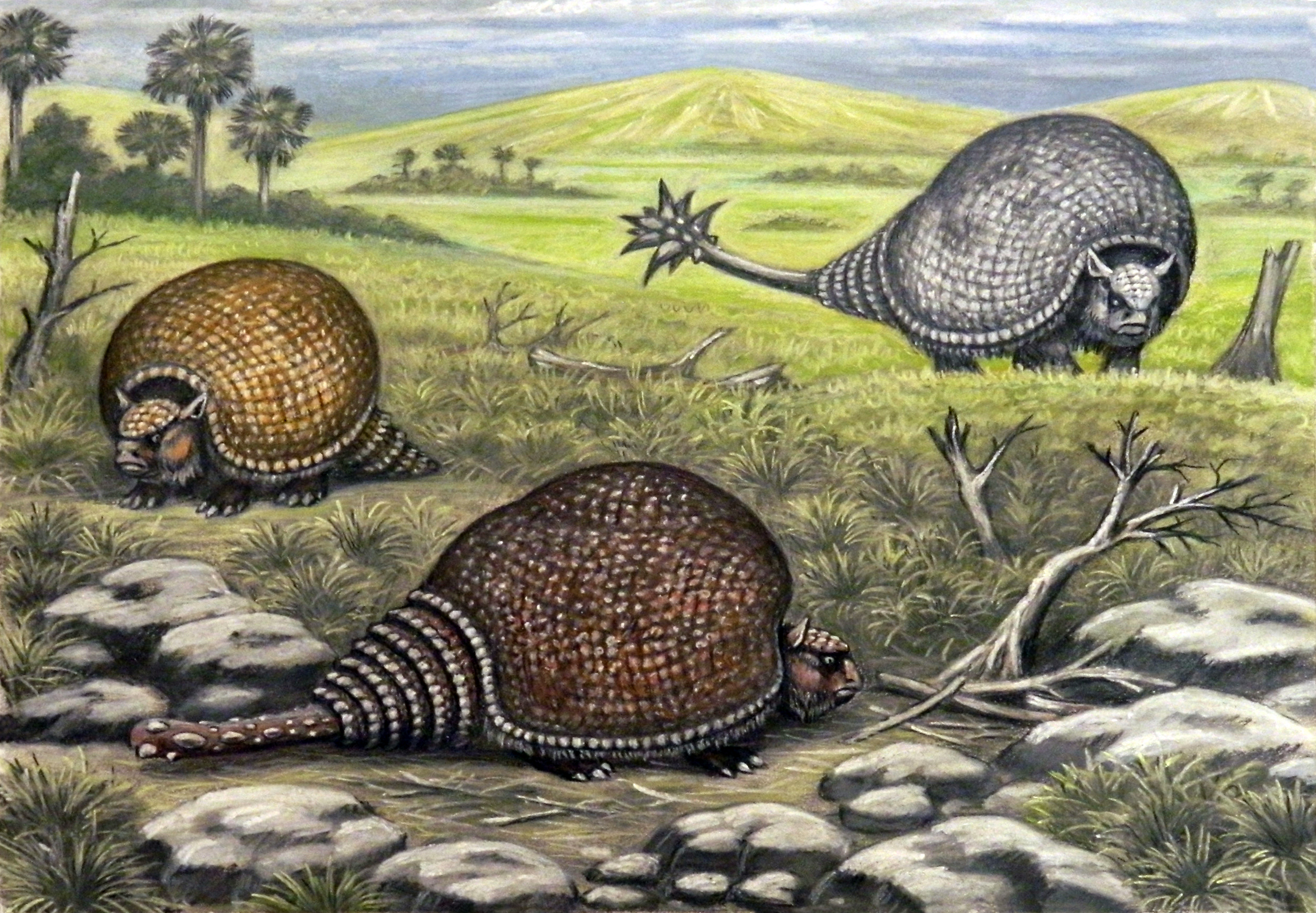
The contemporary glyptodonts Glyptodon (yellow), Doedicurus (grey), and Panochthus (brown)

Following the formation of the Isthmus of Panama about 2.8 mya, South America's long period of isolation from the rest of the world ended and it was invaded by North American species as part of the Great American Interchange. Glyptodonts would have encountered new large mammalian carnivores such as the short-faced bear, saber toothed cats such as Smilodon and Homotherium, and the jaguar. These had replaced the former endemic top predators: sebecid crocodylomorphs, madtsoiid snakes, terror birds, and the marsupial-like sparassodonts. In addition to bears and cats, other immigrants to South America include horses, camels, deer, elephants (gomphotheres), tapirs, and New World rats. Native Pleistocene South American mammals include xenarthrans, such as glyptodonts, ground sloths, anteaters, and armadillos; as well as marsupials; the large toxodonts; and native rodents such as New World porcupines.

Doedicurus is among the most commonly identified glyptodont genera of the Pleistocene, alongside Glyptodon, Neosclerocalyptus, Hoplophorus, Neuryurus, and Panochthus. Glyptodonts generally inhabited open grassland with temperate to cool climate. It appears to have been restricted to the cold, humid Chaco-Pampean plains of northeastern Patagonia. Fossils have been found in Argentina, Brazil, and Uruguay. The Pleistocene was characterized by frequent cold/warm cycles (glacials and interglacials), and sequences in Patagonia record over 15 glacial cycles, indicated by the switch from loess (deposited during glacials) to paleosol (during interglacials). Glacials may have seen an increase in savanna, whereas interglacials (including modern day) are characterized by an expansion of rainforests.

== Extinction ==
Doedicurus may be the most recent-surviving glyptodont species, with the latest fossils suggested to date to about 8,000–7,000 years ago in the Pampas, though a G. claviceps specimen was contentiously dated to about 4,300 years ago. A 2019 study suggested that these Holocene ages at Pampean sites are underestimates due to contamination by humic acids, more likely dating to the Late Pleistocene.

Doedicurus, like many other megafauna around the world, went extinct in the Quaternary extinction event, which may have been caused by some combination of overhunting by humans and climate change. A butchered specimen dating to 7,500–7,000 years ago in this region on the edge of a swamp at the La Moderna site in Argentina shows that Doedicurus was hunted by the first human settlers of South America and coexisted with them for several thousand years. Because many other South American megafauna also seem to have persisted for some time following the close of the Pleistocene in this region—such as the armadillo Eutatus, the giant ground sloth Megatherium, and the dog Dusicyon avus—the Pampas may have been a refuge zone provided the dating is correct, providing productive grassland which was likely in decline elsewhere on the continent. Their final demise may have been brought on or simply accelerated by human hunting. However, a later study suggested that the late date for Doedicurus at La Moderna as well as other supposedly Holocene dated megafauna at other Pampas sites was likely due to contamination or other errors, casting doubt on their Holocene survival.

== See also ==
- Megatherium
- Panochthus
- Titanis
