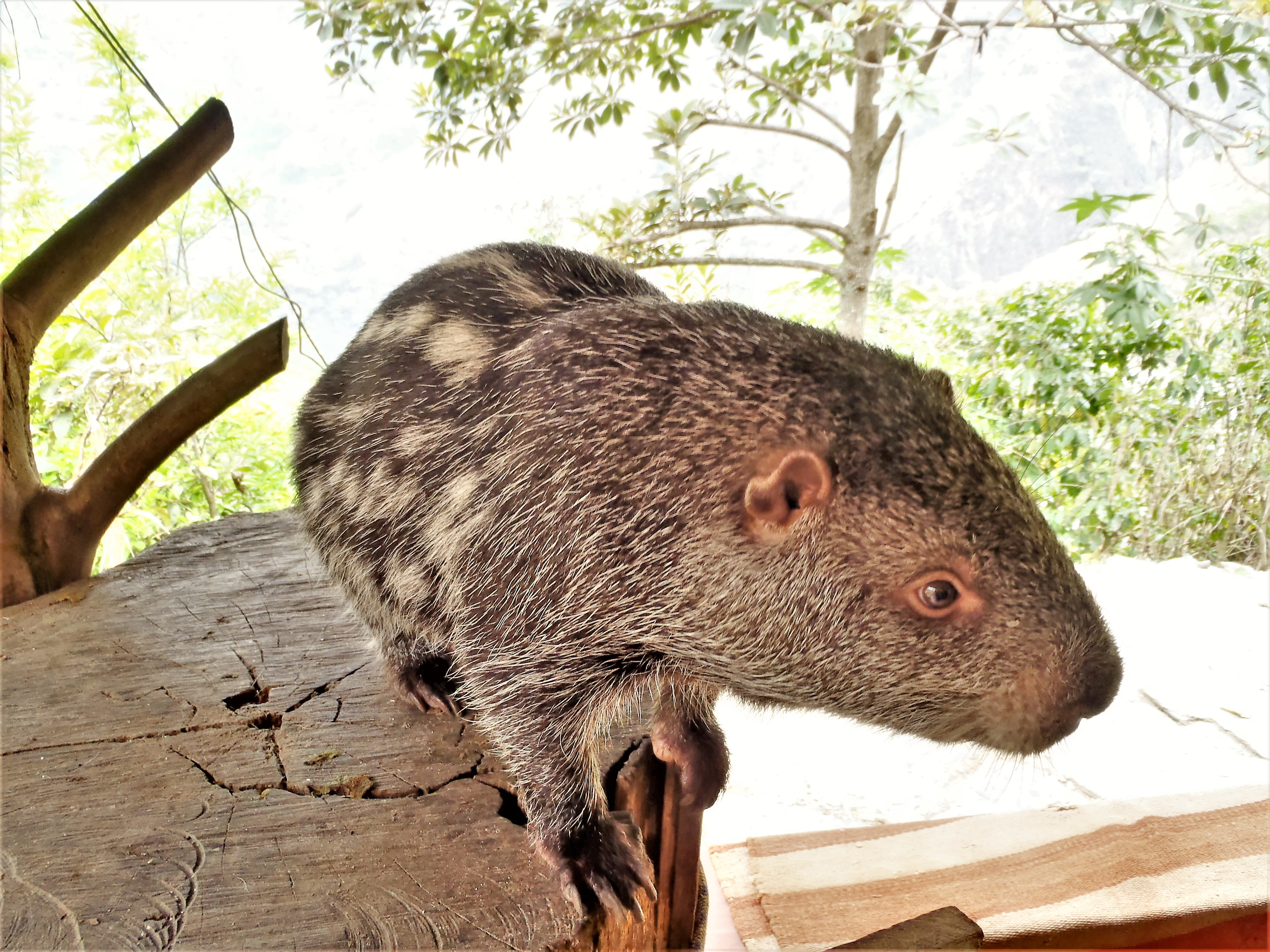
- Pacarana (Dinomys branickii)

Scientific classification
- Kingdom: Animalia
- Phylum: Chordata
- Class: Mammalia
- Order: Rodentia
- Superfamily: Chinchilloidea
- Family: Dinomyidae; Peters, 1873

Genera
- See text

= Dinomyidae =

Dinomyidae Temporal range: Early Miocene–Recent

Family of rodents

The Dinomyidae are a family of South American hystricognath rodents: the dinomyids were once a very speciose group, but now contain only a single living species, the pacarana. Several of the extinct dinomyids were among the largest rodents known to date; these included the bison-sized Josephoartigasia monesi and the smaller Josephoartigasia magna. The dinomyids are thought to have occupied ecological niches associated with large grazing mammals due to their ability to compete with the native ungulates of South America. Conversely, they could feed on aquatic or swampy plants along the ancient rivers. These large forms disappeared after the formation of a connection to North America. The modern pacarana is only modest, considerably smaller than the capybara.

The Neoepiblemidae, an entirely extinct family, may be part of the Dinomyidae; both groups are undoubtedly closely related.

== Genera ==
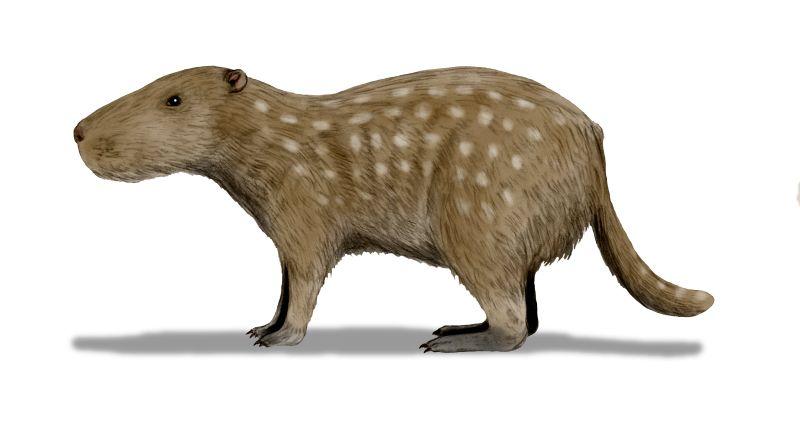
Josephoartigasia

- Family: Dinomyidae
  - †Agnomys incertae sedis
  - †Borikenomys - incertae sedis?
  - †Pseudodiodomus incertae sedis
  - Subfamily: Dinomyinae
    - Dinomys - pacarana
    - †Telodontomys
  - Subfamily: †Eumegamyinae
    - †Arazamys
    - †Briaromys
    - †Colpostemma
    - †Doellomys
    - †Eumegamysops
    - †Eumegamys
    - †Gyriabrus
    - †Isostylomys
    - †Josephoartigasia
    - †Orthomys
    - †Pentastylodon
    - †Pseudosigmomys
    - †Telicomys
    - †Tetrastylus
  - Subfamily: †Potamarchinae
    - †Eusigmomys
    - †Olenopsis
    - †Potamarchus
    - †Scleromys
    - †Simplimus
