= Neochoerus aesopi =

Neochoerus aesopi Temporal range: Pleistocene 2.5–0.012 Ma

Scientific classification
- Kingdom: Animalia
- Phylum: Chordata
- Class: Mammalia
- Order: Rodentia
- Family: Caviidae
- Genus: †Neochoerus
- Species: †N. aesopi

Binomial name
- †Neochoerus aesopi Leidy, 1853

Synonyms
- Hydrochoerus holmesi Simpson, 1928; Hydrochoerus robustus Leidy, 1886; Neochoerus robustus Leidy, 1886

Species of rodent

Neochoerus aesopi is an extinct species of relatively large rodent that lived in North America during the Pleistocene epoch until its extinction about 12,000 years ago. Belonging to the subfamily Hydrochoerinae, it is closely related to the modern capybaras of the genus Hydrochoerus. Fossils of it have been found in U.S. states such as Florida and South Carolina. The species was originally outlined in 1853. It weighed about 80 kg, being similar in size to the modern-day capybara.

Hydrochoerus holmesi and several other formerly recognized extinct taxa have been synonymized with N. aesopi. Identification of these types of rodent fossils is an inexact science, and lines between various classifications are often questionable. Unlike extant capybaras, N. aesopi lived in North America, where its ancestors had migrated from South America during the Great American Interchange.

== See also ==
- Hydrochoerinae
  - Hydrochoerus
- Neochoerus
  - Neochoerus pinckneyi
