= Carlos de la Torre y Huerta =

Cuban naturalist (1858–1950)

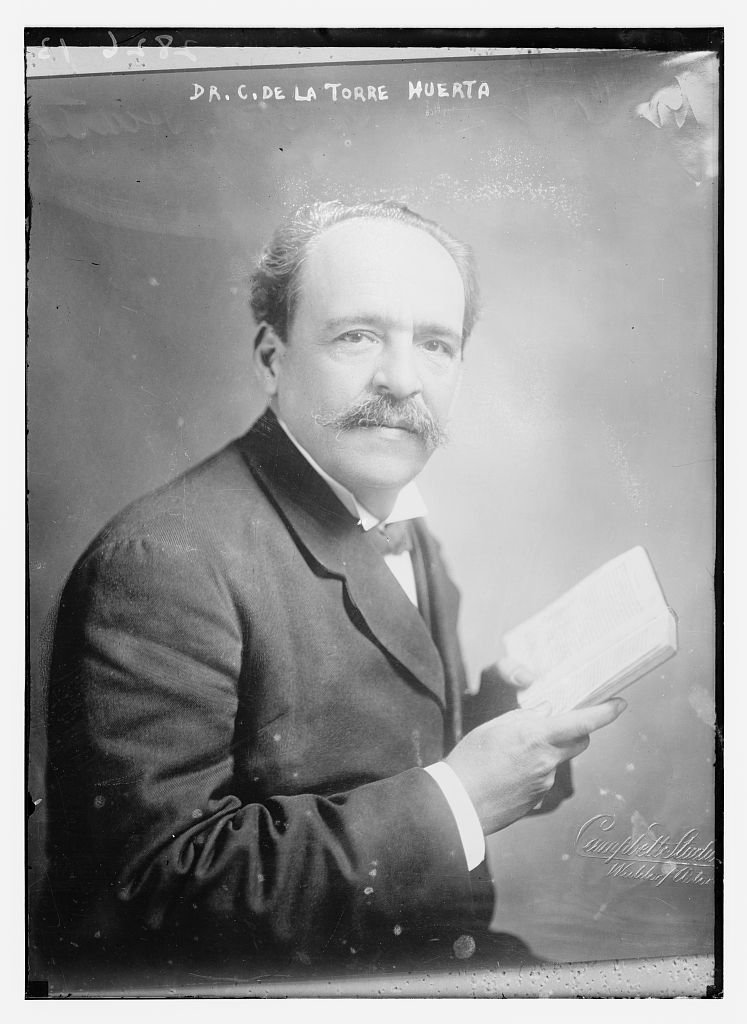
Huerta circa 1915

Carlos de la Torre y Huerta (May 15, 1858 in Matanzas, Cuba – February 19, 1950 in Havana) was a Cuban naturalist.

He was the president of House of Representatives from November 1903 to April 1904.

He is commemorated in the scientific names of a species of Cuban gecko, Sphaerodactylus torrei, as well as the genus Torreites of a now extinct rudist bivalve from the Cretaceous period, and the recently extinct spiny-rat Boromys torrei.
