= Phoberomys burmeisteri =

Phoberomys burmeisteri Temporal range: Late Miocene

Scientific classification
- Kingdom: Animalia
- Phylum: Chordata
- Class: Mammalia
- Order: Rodentia
- Family: †Neoepiblemidae
- Genus: †Phoberomys
- Species: †P. burmeisteri

Binomial name
- †Phoberomys burmeisteri Ameghino, 1886

Synonyms
- Phoberomys insolita Kraglievich, 1940

Extinct species of rodent

Phoberomys burmeisteri is an extinct rodent that lived during the late Miocene in southern South America. It lived in wetland environments, such as swamps and marshes, where it likely fed on aquatic plants and grasses. Their remains were recovered from the Ituzaingó Formation in Entre Ríos Province, Argentina.

P. burmeisteri was one of the largest rodents that ever existed, with an estimated weight of up to 1,543 pounds (700 kg) and a length of over 10 feet (3.0 m). This massive size allowed it to feed on tough plant material and avoid predation by most carnivores.

Many species of Phoberomys (P. praecursor, P. insolita, P. lozanoi and P. minima) were described for the Ituzaingó Formation, but were recently synonymized with P. burmeisteri.

The exact cause of P. burmeisteri's extinction is unknown, but it is thought to have occurred during the Pliocene epoch, around 2.5 million years ago. The arrival of large predators, climate change, or changes in vegetation may have contributed to its demise.
