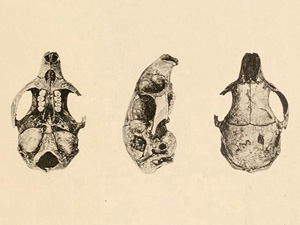

Scientific classification
- Domain: Eukaryota
- Kingdom: Animalia
- Phylum: Chordata
- Class: Mammalia
- Order: Rodentia
- Family: Echimyidae
- Subfamily: †Heteropsomyinae
- Genus: †Boromys; Miller, 1916

Type species
- Boromys offella Miller, 1916

Species
- †Boromys offella †Boromys torrei

= Boromys =

Boromys Temporal range: Holocene

Extinct genus of rodents

Boromys is an extinct genus of Cuban rodents in the family Echimyidae. It contains the following species:

- Oriente cave rat (Boromys offella)
- Torre's cave rat (Boromys torrei)
