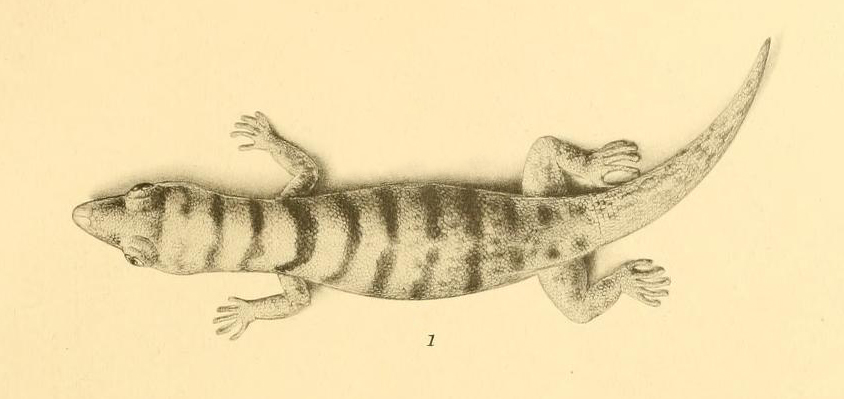

Conservation status
- Endangered (IUCN 3.1)

Scientific classification
- Kingdom: Animalia
- Phylum: Chordata
- Class: Reptilia
- Order: Squamata
- Suborder: Gekkota
- Family: Sphaerodactylidae
- Genus: Sphaerodactylus
- Species: S. torrei

Binomial name
- Sphaerodactylus torrei Barbour, 1914

= Sphaerodactylus torrei =

Species of lizard

Sphaerodactylus torrei, also known commonly as Barbour's least gecko or the Cuban broad-banded geckolet, is a small species of lizard in the family Sphaerodactylidae. The species is endemic to Cuba.

== Etymology ==
The specific name, torrei, is in honor of Cuban naturalist Carlos de la Torre y Huerta.

== Habitat ==
The preferred habitat of S. torrei, is forest.

== Description ==
S. torrei has "very small minute granule-like" dorsal scales.

== Reproduction ==
S. torrei is oviparous.

== Subspecies ==
Two subspecies are recognized as being valid, including the nominotypical subspecies.

- Sphaerodactylus torrei spielmani Grant, 1958
- Sphaerodactylus torrei torrei Barbour, 1914
