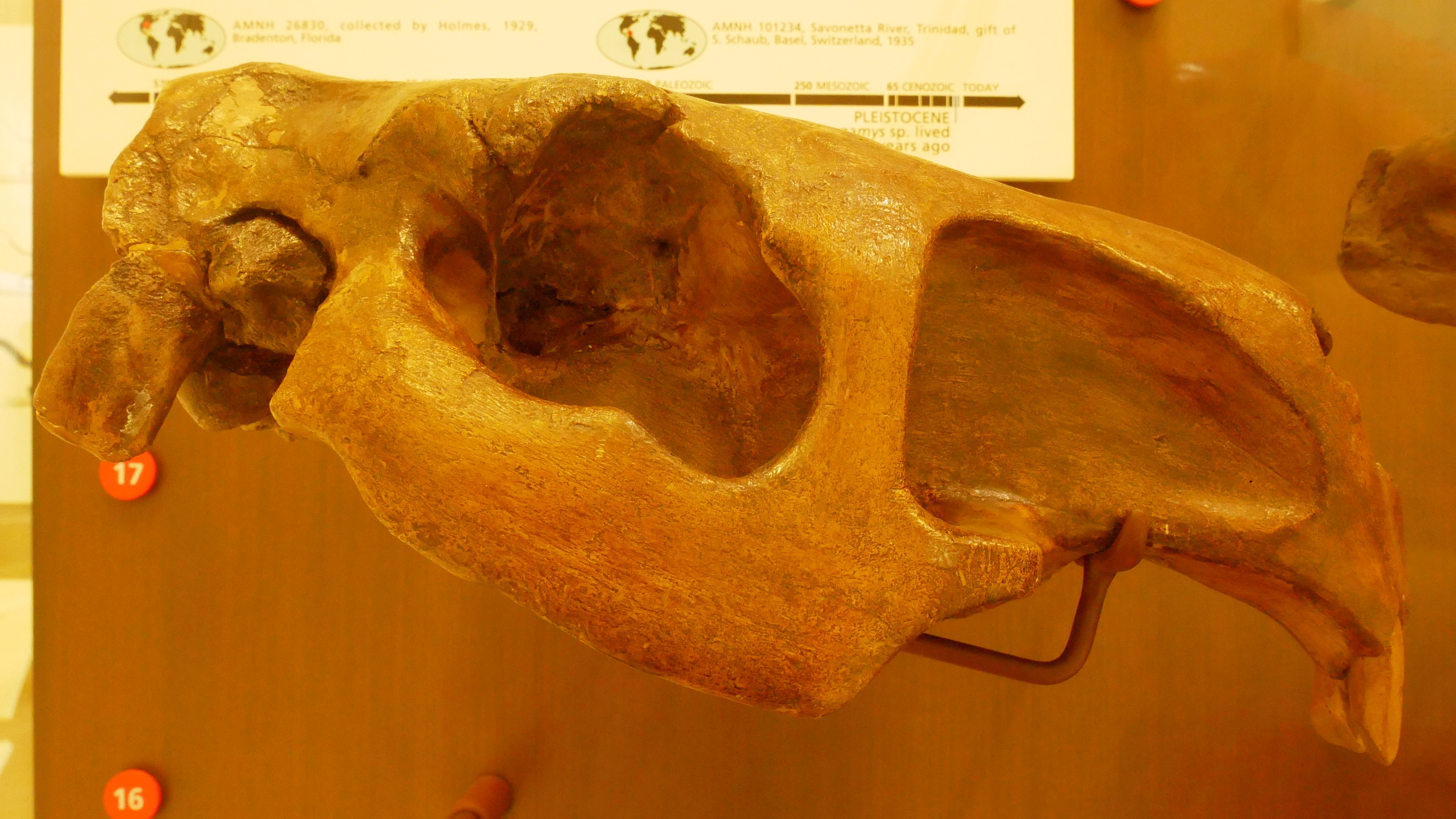

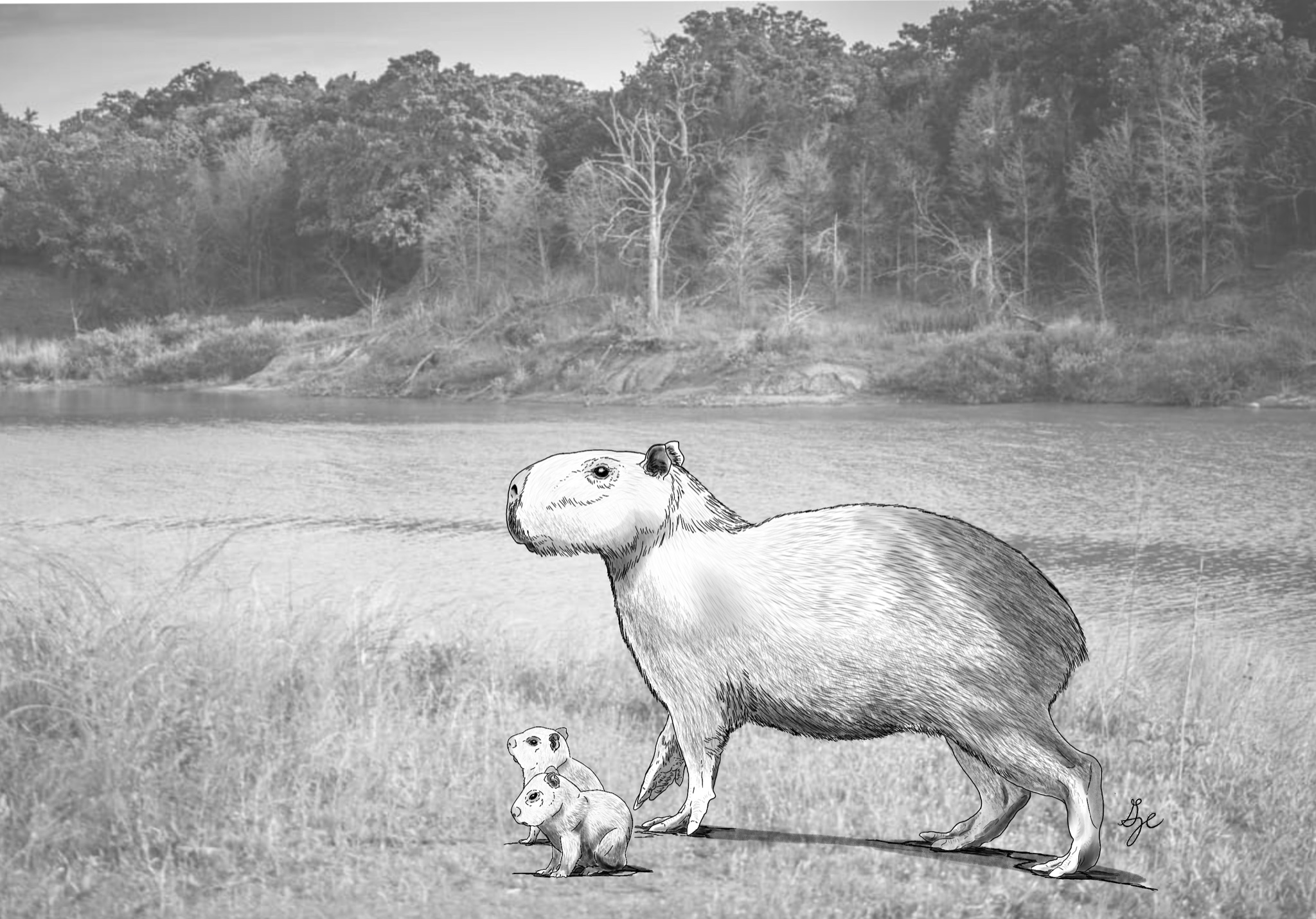
- Paleoart of Neochoerus pinckneyi

Scientific classification
- Kingdom: Animalia
- Phylum: Chordata
- Class: Mammalia
- Order: Rodentia
- Family: Caviidae
- Genus: †Neochoerus
- Species: †N. pinckneyi

Binomial name
- †Neochoerus pinckneyi (Hay, 1923)

= Neochoerus pinckneyi =

Neochoerus pinckneyi Temporal range: Pleistocene

Extinct species of rodent

Neochoerus pinckneyi, commonly called Pinckney's capybara, was a North American species of capybara. While capybaras originated in South America, formation of the Isthmus of Panama three million years ago allowed some of them to migrate north as part of the Great American Interchange. Capybaras and porcupines are the only caviomorph rodents that reached temperate North America during this exchange (a much greater diversity of North American rodents invaded South America). At 90–113 kilograms (198–249 lb), 40% larger than the living capybara, N. pinckneyi is one of the largest rodent species ever discovered, surpassed only by Josephoartigasia monesi, several species of Phoberomys, and possibly the Pleistocene giant beaver. Remains have been found in southern North America, from Arizona to Florida to South Carolina, and throughout Central America.
