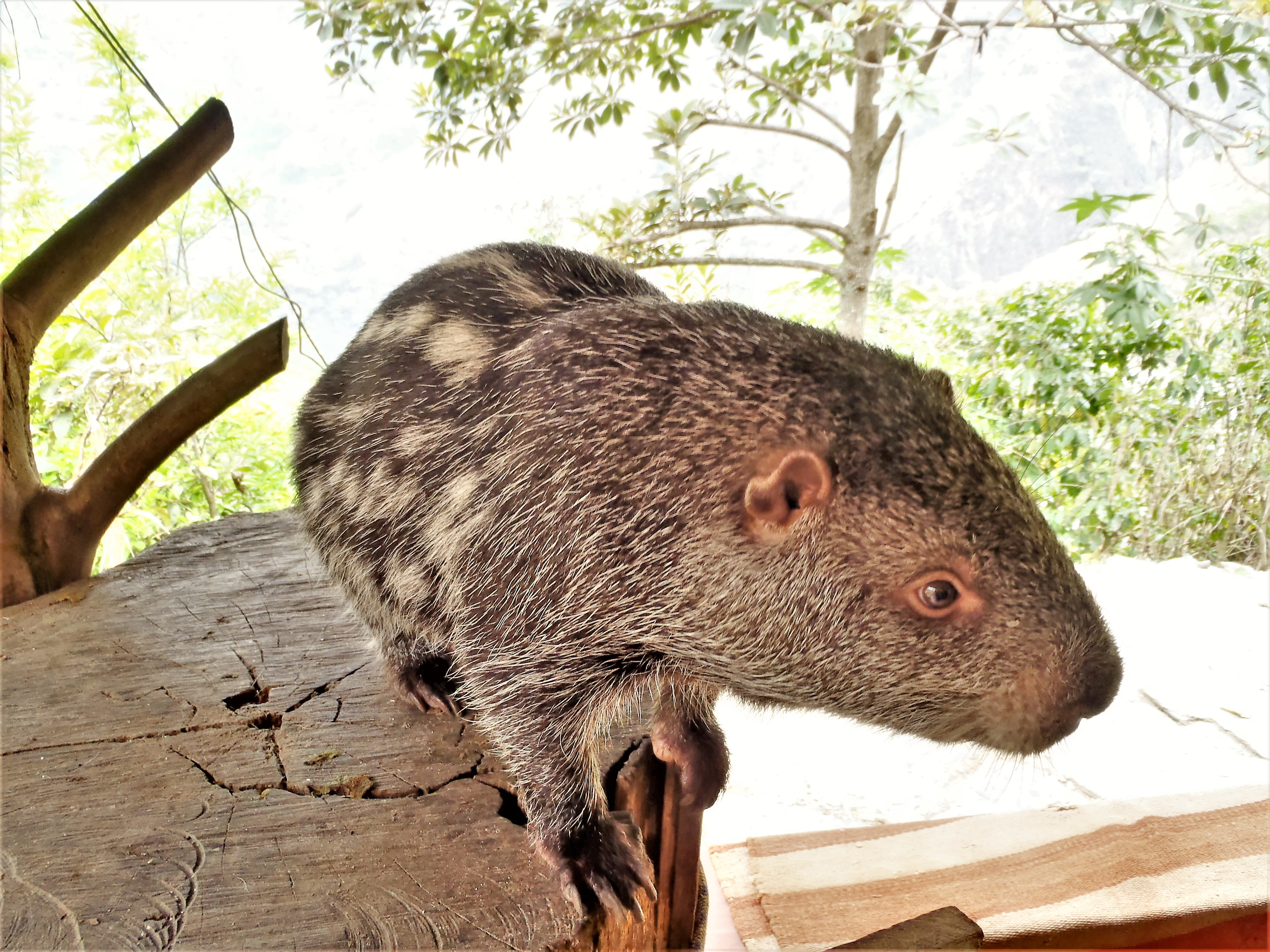
- A pacarana in the Peruvian Amazon

Conservation status
- Least Concern (IUCN 3.1)

Scientific classification
- Kingdom: Animalia
- Phylum: Chordata
- Class: Mammalia
- Order: Rodentia
- Family: Dinomyidae
- Genus: Dinomys; Peters, 1873
- Species: D. branickii

Binomial name
- Dinomys branickii Peters, 1873
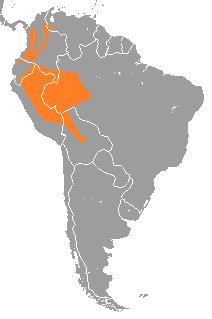

= Pacarana =

Species of rodent

The pacarana (Dinomys branickii) is a rare and slow-moving hystricognath rodent indigenous to South America. Native Tupi people call it the pacarana (false paca) because it is superficially similar to the paca, a different rodent which is not in the same family. The pacarana has a chunky body and is large for a rodent, weighing up to 15 kg (33 lb) and measuring up to 79 cm (2 ft 7 in) in length, not including the thick, furry tail.

The pacarana is nocturnal and is found only in tropical forests of the western Amazon River basin and adjacent foothills of the Andes Mountains. It ranges from northwestern Venezuela and Colombia to western Bolivia, including the Yungas. It is common in Cotapata National Park in Bolivia.

The pacarana is the sole extant member of the rodent family Dinomyidae in the infraorder Caviomorpha; the paca that it resembles in appearance is in a different Caviomorph family, the Cuniculidae. Initially, the pacarana was regarded as a member of the superfamily Muroidea, that includes the true mice, but that view was abandoned in the face of evidence that suggests that the pacarana is in the family Dinomyidae together with extinct animals such as Phoberomys pattersoni and Josephoartigasia monesi, prehistoric giant rodents that lived in South America several million years ago.

Pacaranas typically are found in family groups of four or five.

== Characteristics ==
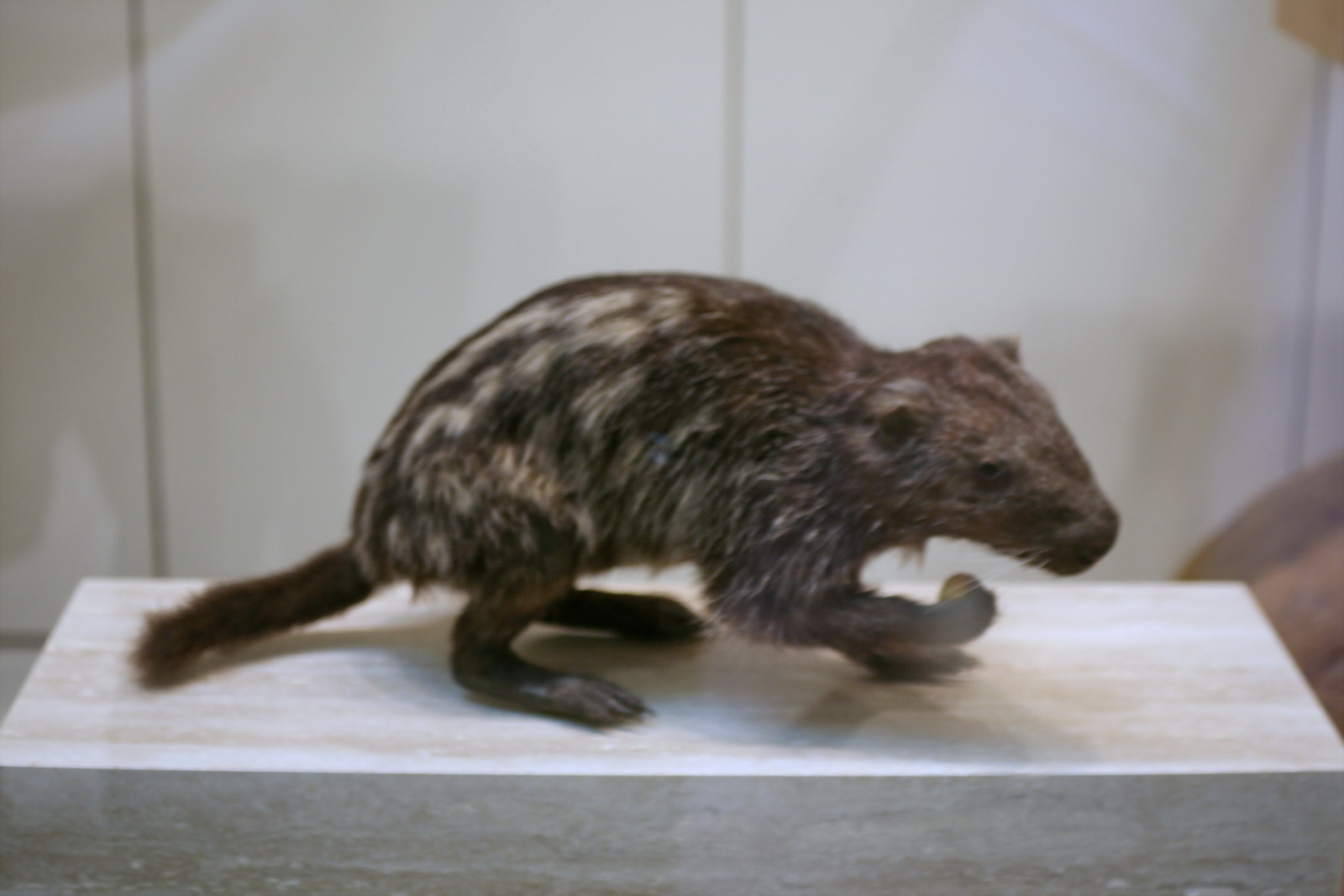
Dinomys branickii

Pacarana have large heads and are considered a scansorial species. When they eat, they grasp their food with their fore-paws while sitting on their hind legs.
