= Charruatoxodon =

Charruatoxodon Temporal range: Late Miocene-Middle Pleistocene (Montehermosan-Ensenadan) ~6.8–0.8 Ma

Scientific classification
- Kingdom: Animalia
- Phylum: Chordata
- Class: Mammalia
- Order: †Notoungulata
- Family: †Toxodontidae
- Subfamily: †Toxodontinae
- Genus: †Charruatoxodon; Ferrero et al., 2022
- Species: †C. uruguayensis

Binomial name
- †Charruatoxodon uruguayensis Ferrero et al, 2022

Extinct genus of mammals

Charruatoxodon is an extinct monotypic genus of notoungulate belonging to the family Toxodontidae. It lived from the Pliocene to the Early Pleistocene in what is now southern Uruguay. Its remains have been found in the San José member of the Raigón Formation, near Montevideo.

== History ==
The holotype of the genus, FC-DPV-514, was described in 1842 by Alcide d'Orbigny and Charles Léopold Laurillard, who assigned it to the species Dinotoxodon paranensis. They believed the specimen to come from the Upper Miocene Camacho Formation. The assignation to the species D. paranensis was contested by Pérez-García in 2004, who only assigned it to the genus Dinotoxodon. In 2013, a study by Perea, Rinderknecht, Ubilla, Bostelmann and Martinez assigned it as Toxodontidae indet., and estimated its remains to be more recent than initially thought, likely the result of the fall of an overlying block containing the remains inside an earlier deposit, and assigned it to the Montehermosan-Ensenadan Raigón Formation. In 2022, a revision of the specimen led by Ferrero, Schmidt, Pérez-García, Perea and Ribeiro finally erected the new genus and species Charruatoxodon uruguayensis, using FC-DPV-514 as holotype.

== Etymology ==
The genus name, Charruatoxodon, is composed from the suffix -toxodon, referring to its relative Toxodon, and the prefix Charrua-, referring to the Charrúa natives, who lived in southern Uruguay before the Spanish colonization and suffered a violent genocide organized by the newly formed Uruguayan government in 1831. The species name, urugayensis, is given after the country were its holotype was found, Uruguay.
