= Manumys =

Manumys Temporal range: Burdigalian

Scientific classification
- Kingdom: Animalia
- Phylum: Chordata
- Class: Mammalia
- Infraclass: Placentalia
- Order: Rodentia
- Superfamily: Chinchilloidea
- Genus: †Manumys; Arnal et al., 2026
- Species: †M. materdei

Binomial name
- †Manumys materdei Arnal et al., 2026

Extinct genus of chinchilloid rodent

Manumys is an extinct monotypic genus of chinchilloid rodent that lived in South America during the Burdigalian stage of the Early Miocene subepoch.

== Etymology ==
The generic name Manumys references Manu National Park in Peru. The specific epithet of the type species, Manumys materdei, means "mother of God" in Latin and references the Madre de Dios River that runs through the area where the holotype of the species was discovered.
