= Borikenomys =

Borikenomys Temporal range: Early Oligocene

Scientific classification
- Kingdom: Animalia
- Phylum: Chordata
- Class: Mammalia
- Infraclass: Placentalia
- Order: Rodentia
- Superfamily: Chinchilloidea
- Genus: †Borikenomys; Marivaux et al., 2020
- Species: †B. praecursor

Binomial name
- †Borikenomys praecursor Marivaux et al., 2020

Extinct monotypic genus of chinchilloid rodent

Borikenomys is an extinct monotypic genus of chinchilloid rodent that lived in Puerto Rico during the Rupelian stage of the Oligocene epoch.

== Etymology ==
The generic name Borikenomys derives from Borikén, the Taíno name for the island of Puerto Rico, and mys, the Greek word for mouse. The specific epithet of the type species, Borikenomys praecursor, references the fact that the species was among the first pioneering rodents to colonise the Greater Antilles.
