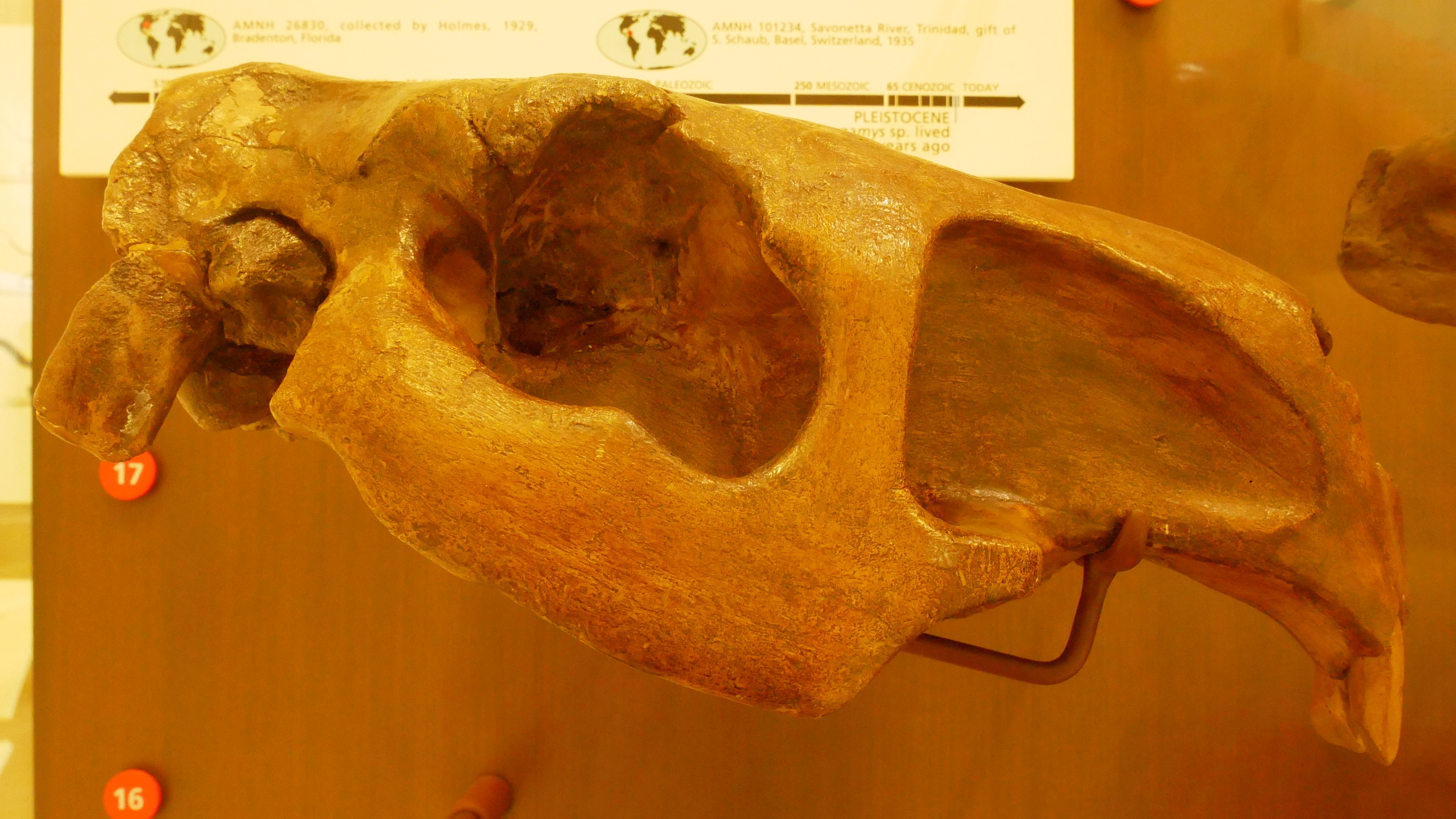
- Neochoerus pinckneyi skull

Scientific classification
- Kingdom: Animalia
- Phylum: Chordata
- Class: Mammalia
- Order: Rodentia
- Family: Caviidae
- Subfamily: Hydrochoerinae
- Genus: †Neochoerus; Hay, 1926

Species
- †Neochoerus aesopi †Neochoerus occidentalis †Neochoerus cordobai †Neochoerus pinckneyi †Neochoerus sirasakae †Neochoerus sulcidens †Neochoerus tarijensis

= Neochoerus =

Neochoerus Temporal range: Pleistocene

Extinct genus of rodents

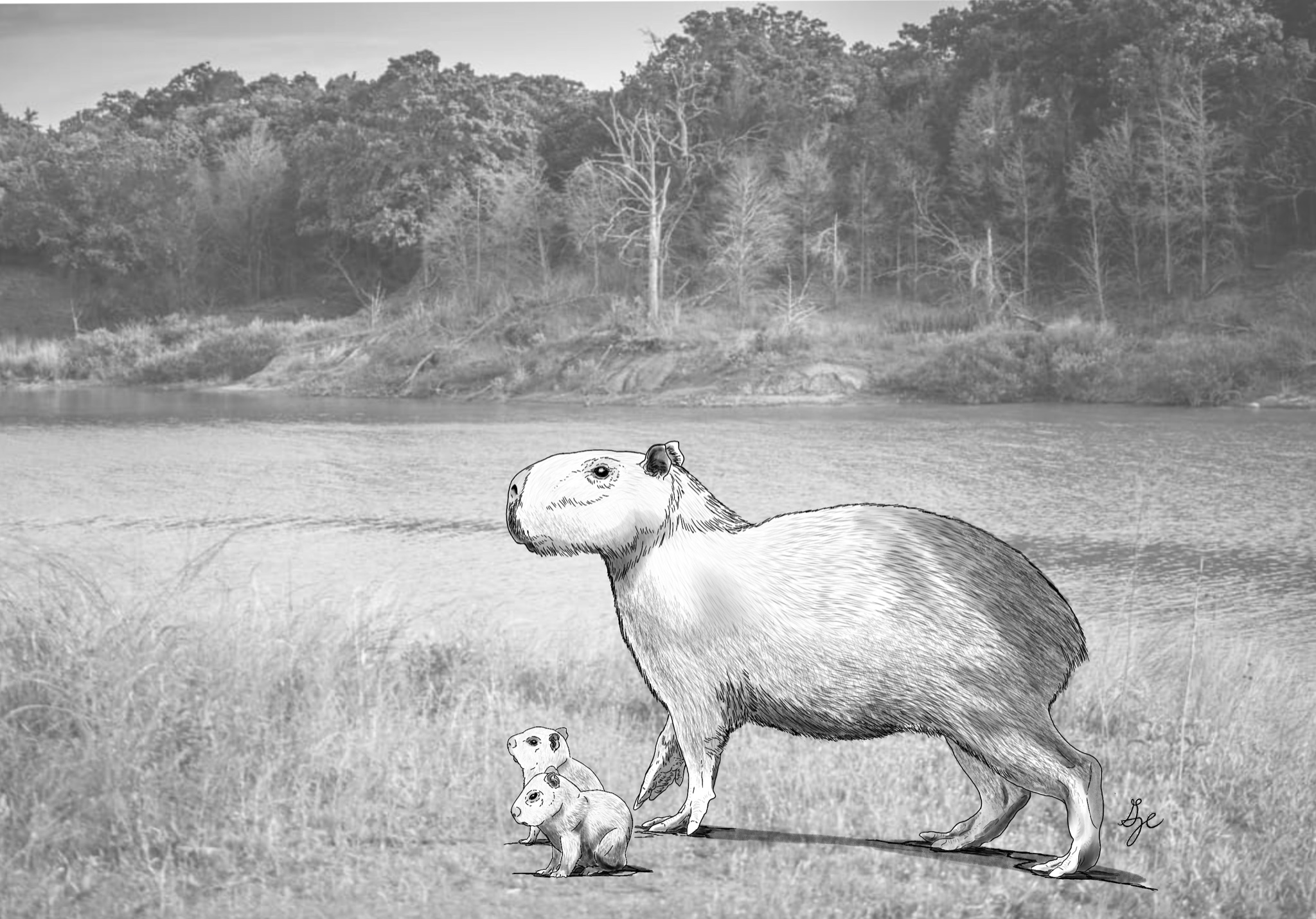
Paleoart of Neochoerus pinckneyi.

Neochoerus ("new hog") is an extinct genus of rodent closely related to the living capybara. Fossil remains of Neochoerus have been found through North America (Mexico and United States) and South America in Boyacá, Colombia.
