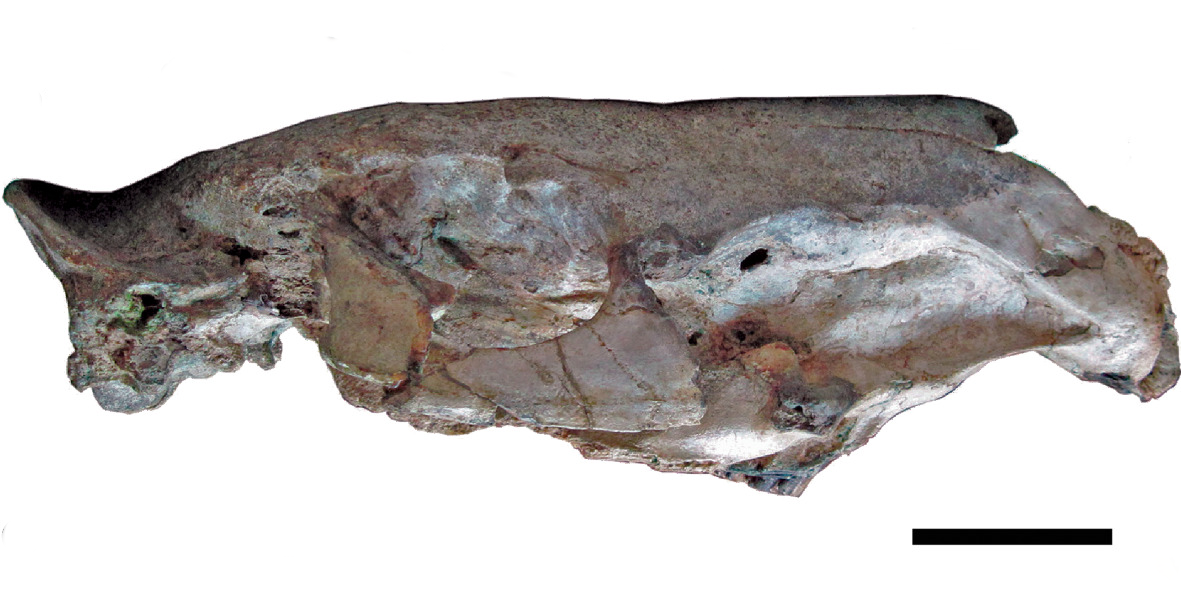
- J. monesi skull, scale = 10 cm (3.9 in)

Scientific classification
- Kingdom: Animalia
- Phylum: Chordata
- Class: Mammalia
- Order: Rodentia
- Family: Dinomyidae
- Genus: †Josephoartigasia; Mones, 2007

Type species
- †Artigasia magna Francis and Mones, 1966

Species
- †J. magna (Francis and Mones, 1966); †J. monesi (Rinderknecht and Blanco, 2008)

= Josephoartigasia =

Josephoartigasia Temporal range: Late Pliocene–Early Pleistocene (Chapadmalalan-Uquian) ~3–2 Ma

Extinct genus of rodents

Josephoartigasia is an extinct genus of enormous dinomyid rodent from the Early Pliocene to Early Pleistocene of Uruguay. Its closest living relative is the pacarana. Josephoartigasia is named after Uruguayan national hero José Artigas. It contains two species: J. magna, described in 1966 based on a left mandible, and J. monesi, described in 2008 based on a nearly complete skull. Both are reported from the San José Member of the Raigón Formation by the Barrancas de San Gregorio along Kiyú beach.

The skull of J. monesi measures 53 cm (1 ft 9 in), similar to a beef cow skull, equating to a full body length of 262.8 cm (8 ft 7 in)—though this is likely an overestimate—and a weight of about 480–500 kg (1,060–1,100 lb). This makes J. monesi the biggest rodent ever discovered. It was much larger than J. magna, giant hutia or the largest living rodent, the capybara, which averages 60 kg (130 lb). J. monesi also had a massive bite force of approximately 1,400 N (310 lb_{f}) at the incisors (on par with large carnivores) and 5,000 N (1,100 lb_{f}) at the third molar (rivaling large crocodilians). Its skull was heavily reinforced to withstand high stresses far exceeding what bite force alone could exert, so it could have been using its teeth to crack nuts, excavate large burrows, dig up roots, or defend itself against predators.

Josephoartigasia lived in a forested estuarine environment, alongside toxodontids, ground sloths, glyptodonts, scimitar-toothed cats, terror birds, and thylacosmilids. Like other giant extinct rodents, Josephoartigasia predominantly ate C^{3} plants, such as leaves or fruits, though the extreme bite force of J. monesi would have permitted it to consume a wide variety of different plants if necessary.

== Discovery and etymology ==
Location of Kiyú beach in Uruguay where Josephoartigasia is known from

The rodent was first described based on material collected from the Barrancas de San Gregorio, Uruguay, a series of sea cliffs in the San José Department by Kiyú beach. The enormous fossils, catalogue number 28.VI.65.1 SPV-FHC, comprise a left mandibular (lower jaw) fragment which preserves the bottom part of the incisor, the premolar, the first two molars, a cavity corresponding to the third molar, and the ramus (the portion of the lower jaw that comes up to connect to the skull). In 1966, Uruguayan paleontologists Julio César Francis and Álvaro Mones made this the type specimen of a new genus and species, Artigasia magna. They also identified a paratype, 26-XI-64-29 SPV-FHC, the tip half of the lower left incisor. The genus name honors Uruguayan national hero José Artigas, and magnus is Latin for "large".

In 2007, Mones renamed the genus as Josephoartigasia because the previous name was a junior homonym of Artigasia, a genus of nematodes named by parasitologist Jesse Roy Christie in 1934 (that is, the name Artigasia was already taken).

In 2008, Uruguayan paleontologist Andrés Rinderknecht and Uruguayan physicist Rudemar Ernesto Blanco described another species, J. monesi, based on a massive and nearly complete skull also from the Barrancas de San Gregorio. The name honors Mones for his work on South American rodents. The skull itself was actually recovered in 1987 and donated to the National Museum of Natural History, Uruguay, by fossil collector Sergio Viera, but sat in their repository until Rinderknecht (who worked as a curator) came across it.

== Classification ==
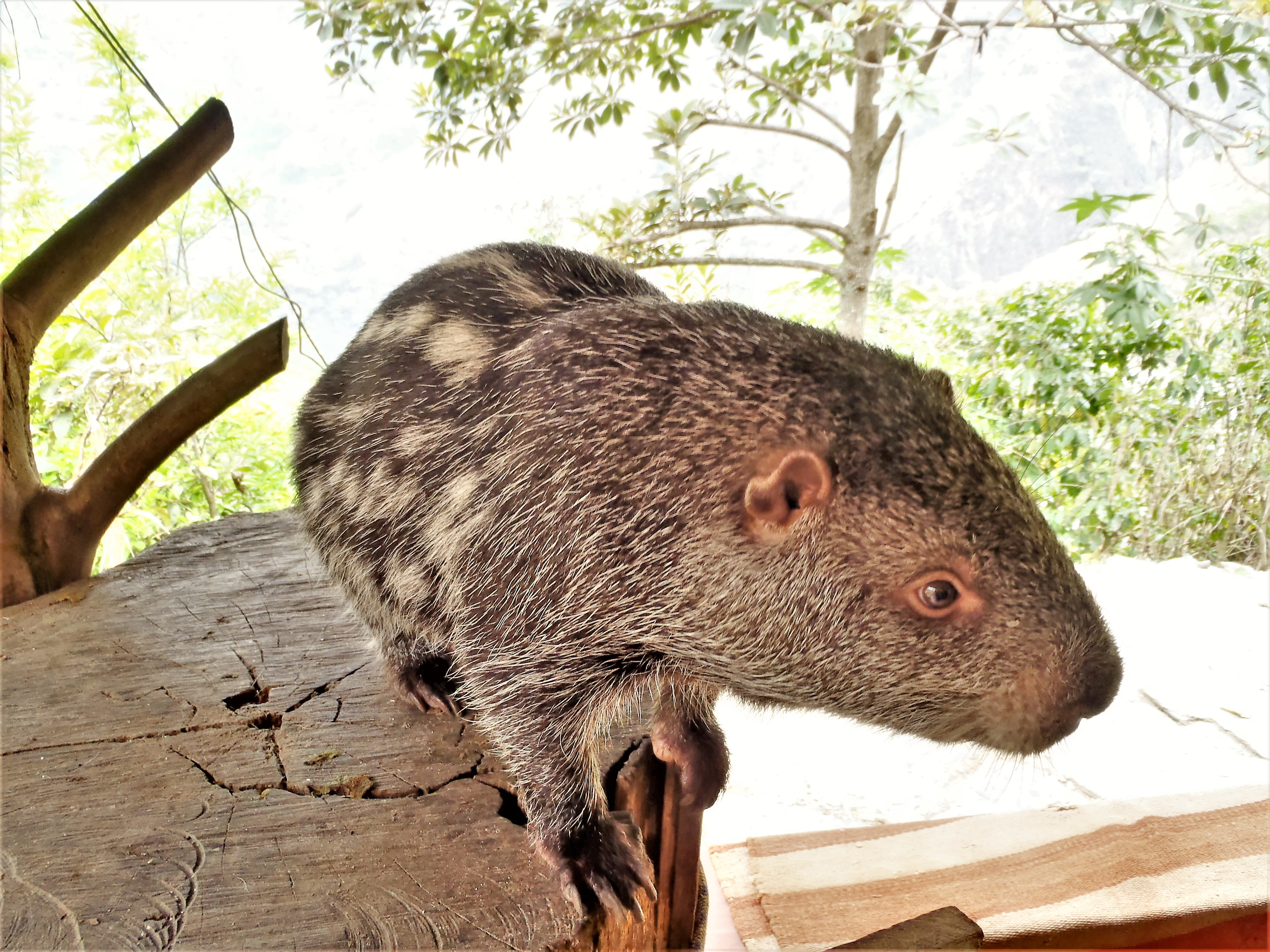
The pacarana is the closest living relative of Josephoartigasia

Josephoartigasia is a member of the family Dinomyidae, a group of hystricognath rodents native to South America, most commonly identified in Argentina, Colombia, Venezuela, and Uruguay. The only living member of Dinomyidae is the pacarana, one of the largest living rodents at 15 kg (33 lb). The family is typically divided into four or five subfamilies: Potamarchinae (which contains the oldest members of the group, to the middle Miocene), Gyriabrinae, Dinomyinae (which only houses the pacarana), Eumegamyinae (which contains the biggest genera), and sometimes Tetrastylinae, which can be merged into Dinomyinae or Eumegamyinae.

Josephoartigasia is classified in Eumegamyinae. Dinomyidae is a poorly defined family, and there is no clear morphological diagnosis that can include every member currently relegated to it. This is because most dinomyid species are known by fragmentary remains of teeth and mandibles, obfuscating how different species are related to each other.

== Age and taphonomy ==
In 1965, Frances and Mones stratigraphically separated the Barrancas de San Gregorio into the Kiyú Formation at the base, the San José Formation above, and the Arazatí Formation at the top. They biostratigraphically dated them to the Montehermosan, Chapadmalalan, and Pampean (Ensenadan) Ages, respectively, according to the South American land mammal age geological timescale. On the international geologic time scale, the older two would correspond to the Upper Pliocene, and the youngest to the Pleistocene.

J. magna was not found in situ (in the spot the fossil was originally deposited in), but in 1966, Frances and Mones assumed it came from one of the older two of the three formations they defined, since eumegamyines had never been reported from the Quaternary. Of those two, they guessed it came from the younger one, the San José Formation, since, on account of its enormous size, they surmised it must be a derived species (it had a lot of time to evolve such a specialized trait from a hypothetically minuscule ancestor). Nonetheless, they could not entirely rule out Kiyú provenance. The San Jose Formation contains fluvial deposits (carried by rivers and streams), and features gray-greenish sandstones and conglomerates, overlain by clayish sandstone with loess-intercalated carbonate pockets.

In 1966, Uruguayan geologists Héctor Goso and Jorge Bossi defined the Raigón Formation, which they subdivided into the San José Member (the same as Francis and Mones' San José Formation) below and the San Bautista Member above. In 1988, Mones identified Lower Pleistocene levels in the San José Member. In 2002, American geologist H. McDonald and Uruguayan paleontologist Daniel Perea suggested the formation may represent a wide timespan from the Montehermosan all the way to the Ensenadan.

J. monesi was recovered in situ from a boulder originating in the San José Member. The boulder is made up of siltstone, claystone, and medium-grained and medium-to-conglomeratic psammite (a type of sandstone) intercalated with siltstone.

== Description ==
=== Teeth ===
The dental formula of Josephoartigasia is 1.0.1.31.0.1.3, with one incisor (I_{1}), no canines, one premolar (P_{4}), and three molars (M_{1}, M_{2}, and M_{3}) in either half of either jaw. As a rodent, the teeth grew continuously throughout the animal's life, there is a gap (diastema, and a rather long one) between the incisors and the grinding teeth (premolars and molars), and the grinding teeth are pushed far forward in the mouth ahead of the eye sockets.

==== Grinding teeth ====
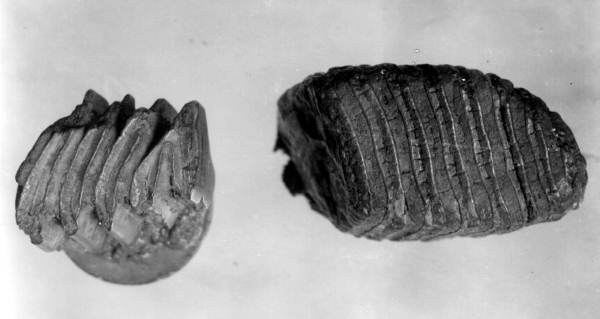
Molars of an extinct capybara-like rodent, exhibiting lophs

The walls of the molars are concave, and the molars are tightly packed together. Like other dinomyids, the occlusal (biting) surface of each grinding tooth has smooth and slightly curved lophs (ridges). The back lophs have a decently thick enamel coat, whereas the front lophs have next to no enamel. This, alongside a sparsity of interprismatic (between crystallic prisms of enamel) cementum, would suggest that the lophs are separated only by a thin layer of enamel. This sloping enamel thickness and thin cementum layer are characteristic of the genus.

In J. magna, the P_{4} has a root surface area of 4.97 cm^{2} (0.770 sq in) and has five lophs; the first and widest is almost an oval with a sharp, thin edge on the labial surface, and a thickened, rounded edge on the lingual surface; the other four lophs are almost quadrilateral with rounded edges on either surface. M_{1} is smaller at 4.31 cm^{2} (0.668 sq in), and the first three frontward lophs fuse into a single loph towards the edge, leaving it with three external and five internal lophs. M_{2} is somewhat bigger at 6 cm^{2} (0.93 sq in), and only the first two lophs fuse, leaving it with four external and five internal lophs. M_{3} is unknown in this species.

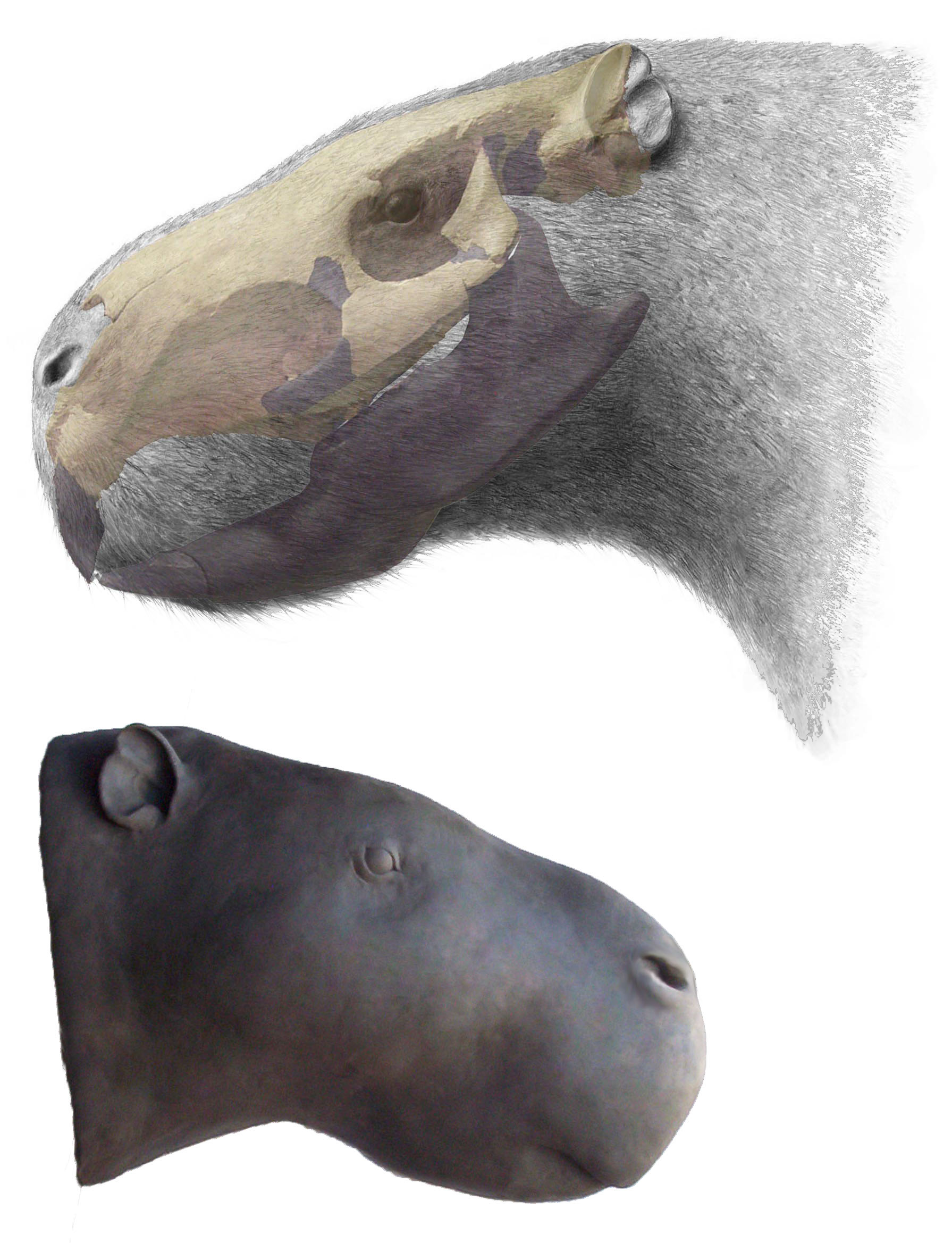
Reconstruction of J. monesi head

In J. monesi, the upper left premolar (P^{4}), left first molar (M^{1}), right second molar (^{2}M), and both third molars (M^{3}) are preserved. The grinding teeth are all about equal size, each having a grinding surface area of about 24 cm^{2} (3.7 sq in). They each have five lophs, but the back three fuse on the lingual (tongue) side, leaving them with three lingual lophs. M^{3} has six lophs, with the front three fusing. The molar series of J. monesi is proportionally shorter than that of J. magna.

==== Incisors ====
The incisor is long and broad. In J. magna, the only known incisor (the lower left, I_{1}) is broken into two pieces. At the base, the edge of the internal face proceeds at a sharp right angle, and the external face at a rounded acute angle. It is triangular, but bevels at the tip, leaving a concave, almost triangular, surface at the tip and base of the incisor. In J. magna, the surface area is 8.29 cm^{2} (1.285 sq in), measuring 3.07 cm × 2.7 cm (1.21 in × 1.06 in) length x width (mesiodistal x linguolabial). In J. monesi, only the base of the right incisor (^{1}I) is known, and the length of the two incisor sockets together is 6.73 cm (2.65 in). J. monesi has a prodigious incisive foramen, corresponding to the blood vessels connected to the incisor.

The incisor of J. monesi at the level of the root had a high section modulus (a measure of an object's ability to resist bending) on account of its extreme incisor procumbency (the incisors were angled instead of pointing straight down), since moving force through a curved body (the incisor) would subject it to much higher bending stresses than if it were straight.

=== Skull ===
J. monesi is the only species for which the skull has been identified. Its skull is massive, measuring 53 cm (1 ft 9 in) in length. For comparison, in a 2007 study, a sample of 110 beef cows belonging to 9 different breeds had a maximum head length of 52.8 cm (1 ft 9 in). Its skull is 65% bigger than the skull size of the previous largest identified rodent, Phoberomys pattersoni.

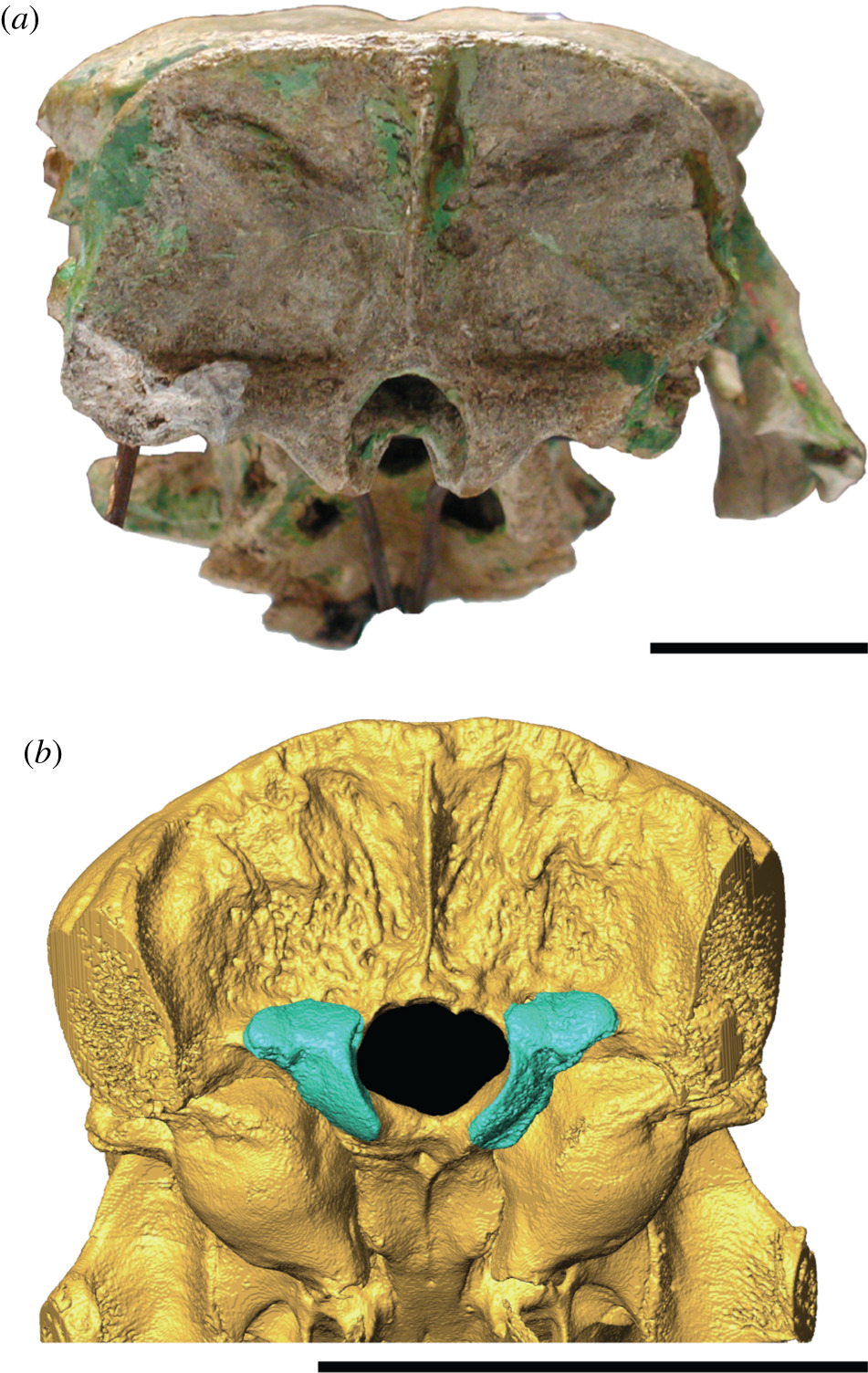
The back of the skull of J. monesi (above) and the pacarana (below), showing their paracondyles (teal for the pacarana) Scale = 5 cm (2 in)

There is nearly complete fusion of several cranial bones, namely the nasal and frontal bones; they are poorly differentiated and the shape and size of each one is difficult to observe, most especially the lacrimal bones in the eye socket. Fusion of the frontal and parietal bones created a mass of bone projecting laterally (out to the side). There is a tall temporal crest arcing across the top of the skull on either side, which join at the midline to form a short sagittal crest. The temporal fossa is narrow but deep. J. monesi has the deepest insertion point for the masseter muscle (which closes the mouth while biting down) of any rodent. It is similarly shaped to that of the large capybara, which is either due to heterochrony (because Josephoartigasia is closely related to the capybara) or allometry (because both Josephoartigasia and the capybara became big). The pterygoid fossa is small, conferring to a reduced medial pterygoid muscle (also important for biting). The zygomatic arches (cheekbones) of J. monesi are unexpectedly slender given how fortified the skull is. Like other dinomyids, the occipital condyles (where the spine connects to the skull) has paracondyles (extra prominences which serve as attachments).

J. monesi probably had a constricted optic canal, which contains the optic nerve and ophthalmic artery, corresponding to vision.

Eumegamyines typically feature an unusual large cavity in the ectotympanic, which holds the eardrum in place. The pacarana has several small cavities (sinuses) in the ectotympanic, so it may be that in many eumegamyines, these cavities enlarged and combined with each other. It is unclear if these sinuses serve a function. Eumegamyines additionally typically have a well developed stylomastoid foramen, which funnels the facial nerve, and a short ear canal. Josephoartigasia, instead, lacks this ectotympanic cavity, and the ear canal is quite long, extending well into the backend of the skull. Its auditory apparatus converges more with those of chinchillids (chinchillas, viscachas, and relatives). Josephoartigasia also has a small auditory bulla, which encloses the middle and inner ear bones.

=== Body mass ===
J. monesi is the first dinomyid whose near complete skull has been discovered; as other dinomyids are known only by highly fragmentary remains, J. monesi presented the first opportunity to estimate the living size of a dinomyid. By absolute measure, it is much larger than J. magna.

In 2008, based on the relation between skull dimensions and body size among 13 specimens belonging to eight different hystricognath rodent genera, Rinderknecht and Blanco estimated a living weight of 468–2,568 kg (1,032–5,661 lb), for an average of 1,211 kg (2,670 lb). For comparison, the largest living rodent, the capybara, weighs about 60 kg (130 lb) on average. This estimate for J. monesi outweighed the then heaviest known rodent, Phoberomys pattersoni, which may have been 400–700 kg (880–1,540 lb), making J. monesi the largest known rodent. Based on this, rodents have the second largest body weight span of any mammalian order, aside from Diprotodontia (the most speciose order of marsupials).

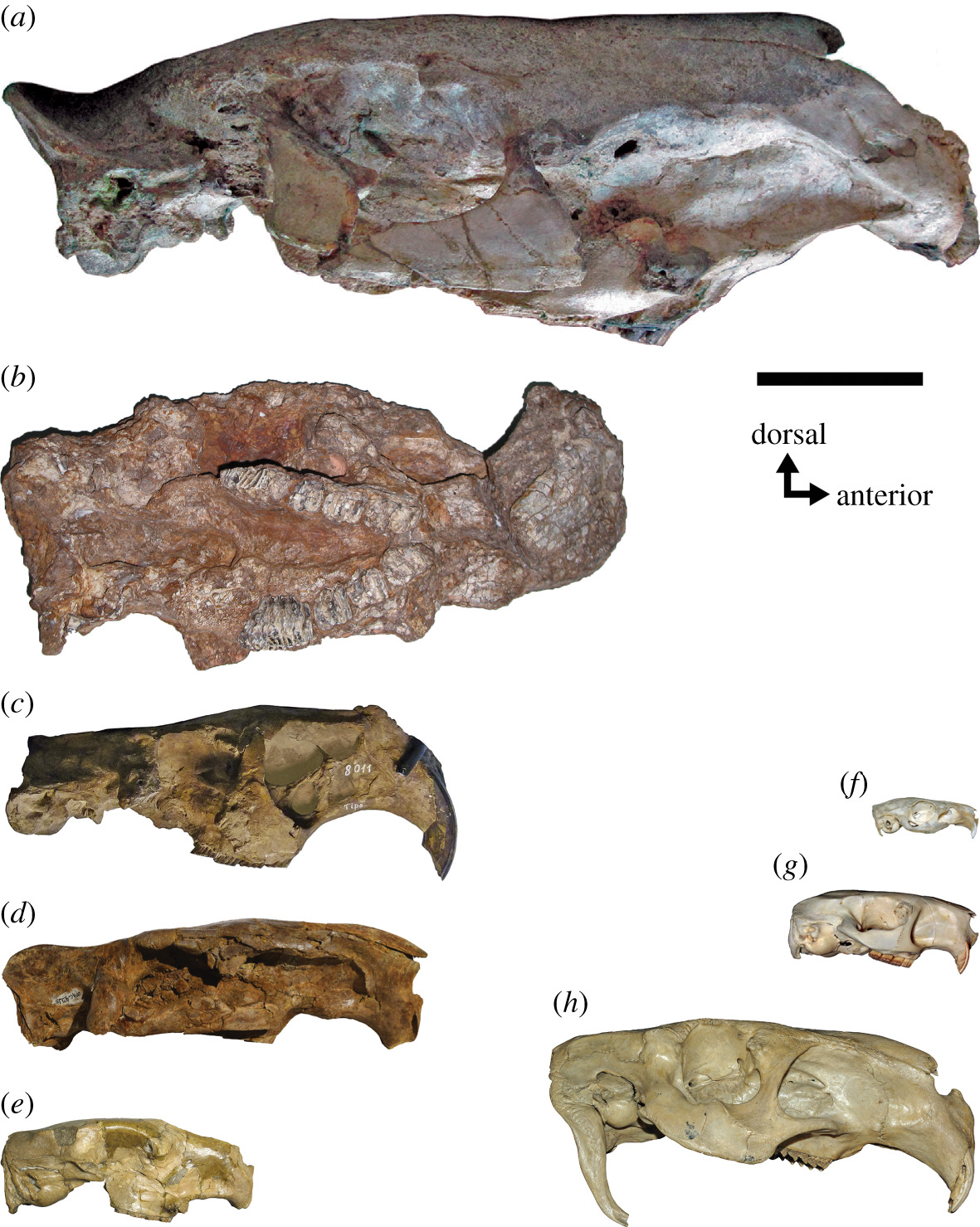
Skull size comparisons between (a) J. monesi, (b) Phoberomys pattersoni, (c) Telicomys giganteus, (d) Neoepiblema acreensis, (e) Tetrastylus intermedius, (f) the guinea pig, (g) the pacarana, and (h) the capybara Scale = 10 cm (3.9 in)

Later that year, Canadian biologist Virginie Millien criticized Rinderknecht and Blanco's skull-to-body-mass equation, as those authors used individual specimens, not species averages to calculate mean values for each species, and only thirteen specimens, three of which were capybara (Hydrochoerus hydrochaeris). This potentially over-represents the influence from capybara and introduces confounding variables if certain specimens in the dataset are much smaller than usual. Indeed, in their dataset, they included a very small 19 kg (42 lb) capybara. Using a wider sample of 35 species, she recalculated the living weight of J. monesi as 272–1,535 kg (600–3,384 lb), with an average of 903.5 kg (1,992 lb). She also cautioned against the use of the skull for body size estimates because, by her methods, the J. monesi skull is 45% longer than expected given tooth size (it may have an unexpectedly long head, inflating predicted body size).

Blanco disagreed with Millien's methods. He pointed out that, while the J. monesi skull may have been unexpectedly long in her dataset, it was not inconsistent with the proportions of its closest living relative, the pacarana. She also estimated the measurements from published photos rather than taking them from the specimen itself, which could confound the results. Blanco also pointed out their average estimates are rather close, about 1,000 kg (2,200 lb), but he was unable to reproduce as low a number as 272 kg (600 lb) that Millien reported as her lowermost bound. Blanco nonetheless conceded his preliminary estimates were not the most meaningful, especially considering the high error margin, as his body mass estimates were not meant to be so high-resolution, rather to give a general idea of the creature's gargantuan nature. He also agreed that reconstructing the body mass of enormous creatures which far exceed the size of living counterparts will always be highly problematic.

In 2022, American biologist Russell Engelman reestimated body sizes of multiple massive dinomyid and neoepiblemid rodents using the width of the occipital condyles where the skull attaches to the spine, because he had earlier demonstrated it to be a reliable metric for this purpose among several therian mammals. He also assumed J. monesi had the same head-to-body ratio as the pacarana, (Note: The head makes up about 18–20% of the pacarana's body length.) producing a body length of 262.8 cm (8 ft 7 in), though he noted these rodents may have proportionally longer heads. He calculated significantly lower body masses: 254–576 kg (560–1,270 lb) for J. monesi and 108–200 kg (238–441 lb) for P. pattersoni. Assuming the paracondyles functioned the same as in paracana, he suggested 480–500 kg (1,060–1,100 lb) is the most likely range for J. monesi; and assuming rabbit-like condyles in P. pattersoni, 125–150 kg (276–331 lb). Though they are still the largest rodents ever discovered, he argued estimates exceeding 600 kg (1,300 lb) are unwarranted.

=== Pathology ===
The type specimen of J. magna is missing its M_{3}, and the tooth socket is badly atrophied. The atrophy of the socket was probably a compensatory response to the missing tooth, sharply reducing jaw height towards the back.

== Paleobiology ==
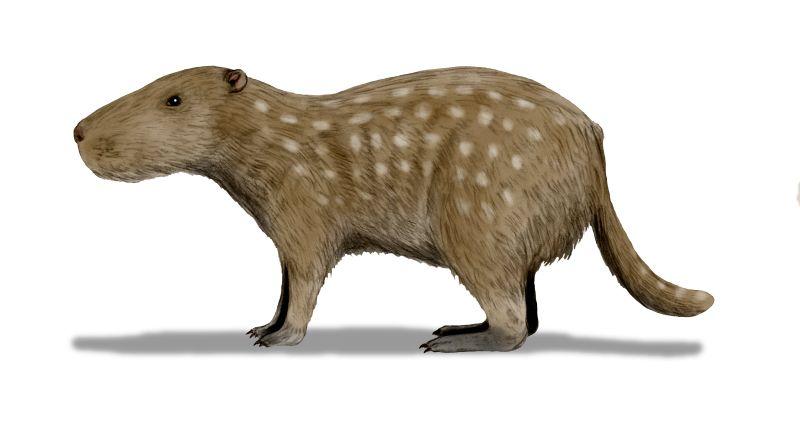
Reconstruction of J. monesi

=== Bite ===
In 2012, Blanco, Rinderknecht, and Uruguayan paleontologist Gustavo Lecuona estimated the bite force of J. monesi at the incisors by reconstructing the major biting muscles and their strengths. They reported 799–1,199 N (180–270 lb_{f}) with a mean of 959 N (216 lb_{f}), which is not entirely unrealistic given the animal's mass. The bite force is comparable to that of many large carnivores (which have a much smaller mass-to-bite-force ratio); for example, the polar bear has a bite force of roughly 751 N (169 lb_{f}) and the jaguar 1,014 N (228 lb_{f}).

In 2015, British anatomist Philip Cox, Rinderknecht, and Blanco used finite element analysis to estimate the absolute maximum possible bite force of 967–1,850 N (217–416 lb_{f}) at the incisor; 2,082–3,970 N (468–892 lb_{f}) at premolar; 2,301–4,389 N (517–987 lb_{f}) at the first molar; 2,533–4,819 N (569–1,083 lb_{f}) at the second molar; and 2,914–5,534 N (655–1,244 lb_{f}) at the third molar. The force at the third molar rivals the bite force of the largest crocodilians. The bites would induce stresses across the skull: 24.8 MPa (3,600 psi) for a bite at the incisors, 23.4 MPa (3,390 psi) at the premolars, and 27.4–39.1 MPa (3,970–5,670 psi) across the molars. The compressive and tensile strengths (the stresses at which the bone would fail) of the cranium were respectively 180 and 130 MPa (26,000 and 19,000 psi) so the skull was clearly reinforced for something other than just the bite. For comparison, the peak stresses of felids and canids can range from 5.6–21.8 MPa (810–3,160 psi).

Josephoartigasia had strong and extremely procumbent incisors, a reinforced skull, and a large diastema between the incisors and the grinding teeth. (Note: Rodents can pack the lips into this gap and close their mouth while still baring the incisors. This allows them to gnaw away at something, such as a beaver does with wood, without debris flying into their mouth. Grazing mammals can have similar diastemata to help them eat long blades of grass.) This combination is usually seen in rodents that use their incisors to either dig or process hard objects (such as nuts or wood). If the former, Josephoartigasia could have been digging up roots, or excavating large burrows to inhabit (fossoriality). Mega-burrows have been discovered in South America, but this is not conclusive evidence of fossoriality because Josephoartigasia is not the only animal that could have been carving them out. Powerful incisors were likely also used for defense against predators, contending with terror birds and borhyaenids (marsupial-like carnivores); defense against a charging predator would have subjected the incisors to variable and intense loads, which would necessitate a high section modulus to avoid structural failure.

=== Diet ===
In 2008, Rinderknecht and Blanco preliminarily supposed that J. monesi ate predominantly fruits and soft plants, namely aquatic vegetation as the animal seems to have lived in an estuarine environment. This is because they initially guessed J. monesi could not grind up tough plants due to having weak chewing muscles, on account of its slender cheekbones, proportionally small grinding teeth, and small pterygoids (the pterygoids move the jaw side to side, important for grinding). They later recanted this after calculating an immense bite force for J. monesi. This would have allowed it to consume a wide variety of different foods, hard or soft. Its incisors, in addition to attacking predators, could have been used to dig up roots, much like how elephants use their tusks. The bite force of an elephant has never been measured, impeding more direct comparisons, but because African bush elephants are able to dislodge the opercula (Note: The operculum is a covering creating an airtight seal around a seed. It prevents the seeds from getting oxygen and germinating.) of marula fruit seeds, they must be able to exert at least 2,700 N (610 lb_{f}). Since germination of the seeds is much more likely if they pass through the elephant digestive system, marula may have evolved to be dispersed by mega-herbivores capable of producing such high bite forces ("large-bite-force hypothesis").

Carbon isotope analyses of the enamel of giant fossil rodents, including J. monesi, report that they ate only C^{3} plants, such as leaves or fruits, as opposed to C^{4} plants, such as grasses. The modern capybara, similarly, is known to selectively eat C_{3} over C_{4} plants, even when the latter is much more plentiful, yet they will still eat C_{4} plants in leaner times. This behavior may have also been exhibited in Josephoartigasia.

== Paleoecology ==
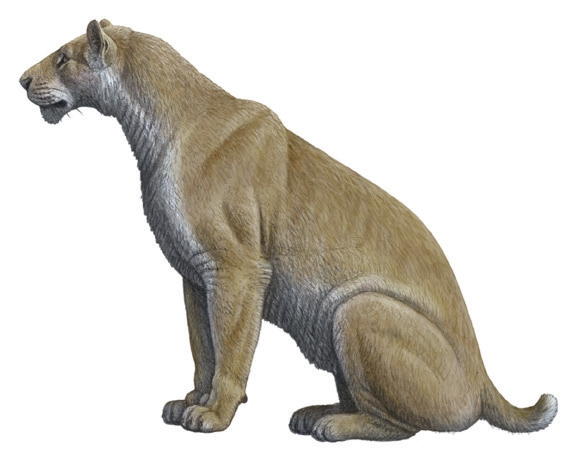
Scimitar-toothed cats like Xenosmilus (above) inhabited Uruguay during the Plio-Pleistocene, alongside Josephoartigasia.

Josephoartigasia has been identified from the San Jose Member of the Raigón Formation. The other animals discovered at this member include: the toxodontids Trigodon and Charruatoxodon, the peccary Platygonus, the ground sloths Catonyx tarijensis and Pronothrotherium figueirasi; the glyptodonts (Glyptodon, Plaxhaplous and Uruguayurus); the darter bird Giganhinga; an indeterminate scimitar-toothed cat, (Note: It was previously assigned to cf. Xenosmilus sp., but its generic attribution is uncertain.) a terror bird (possibly Devincenzia), the capybara Cardiatherium talicei, the vampire bat Desmodus draculae, and several fishes and turtles. The area may have been a forested estuarine environment.

The San Jose Member can be roughly dated to around the Pliocene–Pleistocene boundary. During this time, the Uruguayan climate evolved from a dry and semiarid one with sparse forest cover—coinciding with the onset of the Quaternary glaciation—to a climate that was warmer and more humid than today, effecting reforestation.
