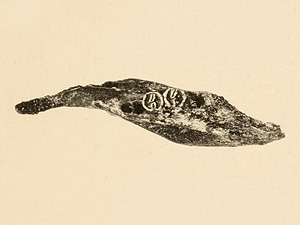

Conservation status
- Extinct (IUCN 3.1)

Scientific classification
- Kingdom: Animalia
- Phylum: Chordata
- Class: Mammalia
- Order: Rodentia
- Family: Echimyidae
- Genus: †Boromys
- Species: †B. offella

Binomial name
- †Boromys offella Miller, 1916

= Oriente cave rat =

Oriente cave rat Temporal range: Holocene

Extinct species of rodent

The Oriente cave rat (Boromys offella) is an extinct species of rodent in the family Echimyidae. It was endemic to Cuba. Its natural habitat was subtropical or tropical moist lowland forests. It is known from recent fossil records, and may have become extinct with the introduction of other rats.
