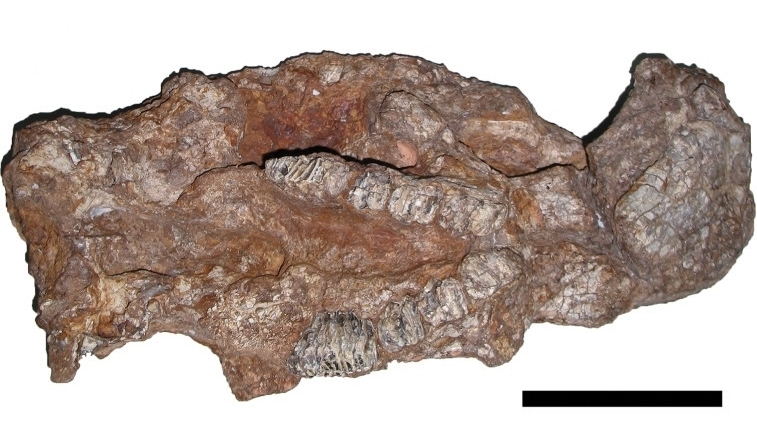
- Fossil specimen

Scientific classification
- Kingdom: Animalia
- Phylum: Chordata
- Class: Mammalia
- Order: Rodentia
- Family: †Neoepiblemidae
- Genus: †Phoberomys
- Species: †P. pattersoni

Binomial name
- †Phoberomys pattersoni Mones 1980

Synonyms
- Dabbenea pattersoni Mones 1980

= Phoberomys pattersoni =

Phoberomys pattersoni Temporal range: Late Miocene (Huayquerian) ~9.0–6.8 Ma

Extinct species of rodent

Phoberomys pattersoni is an extinct rodent that lived in the ancient Orinoco River delta around 8 million years ago. It was the second-largest of the roughly seven species of its genus. Like many other rodents, Phoberomys was a herbivore with high-crowned premolars and molars.

== Description ==
An almost complete skeleton was discovered in the Urumaco Formation at Urumaco, Venezuela, in 2000. The new species was later classified with the name Phoberomys pattersoni in honor of palaeontologist Brian Patterson.

Originally, Phoberomys pattersoni was estimated as being approximately 741 kg based on dimensions of the femur, which at the time made it the largest known species of rodent, living or extinct. However, these estimates were criticized as being too large by later studies, which found that Phoberomys had an exceptionally thick femur relative to its body compared to other mammals. Body mass estimates based on skull length, occipital condyle width, tooth row length, and femur length suggest Phoberomys weighed between 150 and 250 kg (330 and 550 lb), making it about the same size as a large antelopes such as greater kudu and waterbuck. Although Phoberomys pattersoni was considered the largest known rodent at the time of its description, the discovery of a complete skull of Josephoartigasia monesi in 2008 showed this species to be even larger. Josephoartigasia was known at the time of P. pattersoni's discovery (specifically, the species "Artigasia magna", now Josephoartigasia magna), but the size of this rodent could not easily be determined because it was only known from jaw fragments and the teeth of Josephoartigasia are unusually small relative to its body size.
