= Atalayamys =

Scientific classification
- Kingdom: Animalia
- Phylum: Chordata
- Class: Mammalia
- Order: Rodentia
- Parvorder: Caviomorpha
- Family: incertae sedis
- Genus: †Atalayamys; Arnal et al. 2026
- Species: †A. incertum

Binomial name
- †Atalayamys incertum Arnal et al. 2026

Extinct genus of rodent

Atalayamys is an extinct genus of caviomorph rodent with uncertain affinities. The genus contains only a single species, A. incertum, lived during the Miocene epoch in the Amazonian region of Peru.

Its dental morphology consists of brachydonts and generalized molars.
