= Marianamys =

Marianamys Temporal range: Burdigalian

Scientific classification
- Kingdom: Animalia
- Phylum: Chordata
- Class: Mammalia
- Order: Rodentia
- Superfamily: Chinchilloidea
- Genus: †Marianamys; Arnal et al., 2026
- Species: †M. altadens

Binomial name
- †Marianamys altadens Arnal et al., 2026

Extinct genus of chinchilloid rodent

Marianamys is an extinct monotypic genus of chinchilloid rodent that lived in South America during the Burdigalian stage of the Early Miocene subepoch.

== Etymology ==
The generic name Marianamys honours Marianne Van Vlaardingan, who for decades helped facilitate research in Manu National Park and along the Madre de Dios River in Peru. The specific epithet of the type species, Marianamys altadens, means "tall tooth" in Latin.
