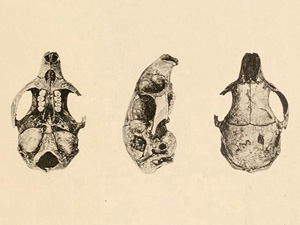

Conservation status
- Extinct (IUCN 3.1)

Scientific classification
- Kingdom: Animalia
- Phylum: Chordata
- Class: Mammalia
- Order: Rodentia
- Family: Echimyidae
- Genus: †Boromys
- Species: †B. torrei

Binomial name
- †Boromys torrei Allen, 1917

= Torre's cave rat =

Extinct species of rodent

Torre's cave rat (Boromys torrei) was a species of rodent in the family Echimyidae. It was endemic to Cuba. Its natural habitat was subtropical or tropical moist lowland forests. The species name honors the Cuban naturalist Carlos de la Torre y Huerta.
