= Álvaro Mones =

Uruguayan zoologist

- Born: Álvaro Jaime Mones Sibillotte
- Scientific career
- Fields: Paleontology
- Author abbrev. (zoology): Mones

Álvaro Jaime Mones Sibillotte (born 7 August 1942 in Montevideo) is a Uruguayan biologist and paleontologist.

The extinct Josephoartigasia monesi is named after him, for his study of South American rodents, including its relative Josephoartigasia magna.
