= Plaxhaplous =

Plaxhaplous Temporal range: Early-Mid Pleistocene (Uquian-Ensenadan) ~2.588–0.781 Ma

Scientific classification
- Kingdom: Animalia
- Phylum: Chordata
- Class: Mammalia
- Order: Cingulata
- Family: Chlamyphoridae
- Subfamily: †Glyptodontinae
- Genus: †Plaxhaplous; Ameghino, 1884
- Species: †P. canaliculatus

Binomial name
- †Plaxhaplous canaliculatus Ameghino, 1884

Extinct genus of mammals

Plaxhaplous was a dubious genus of glyptodont, an extinct relative of the modern armadillo. It lived in the Pleistocene epoch. The type species is Plaxhaplous canaliculatus. Plaxhaplous canaliculatus fossils were found in Argentina, near Luján in Buenos Aires Province. Plaxhaplous fossils have also been found in Uruguay. and in the Charana Formation of Bolivia.

== Description ==
Like all glyptodonts, Plaxhaplous was endowed with a carapace. This carapace was formed by bony osteoderms, which formed a rigid and robust structure which protected the animal from predators.

== Etymology ==
The name Plaxhaplous means simple, flat surface.
