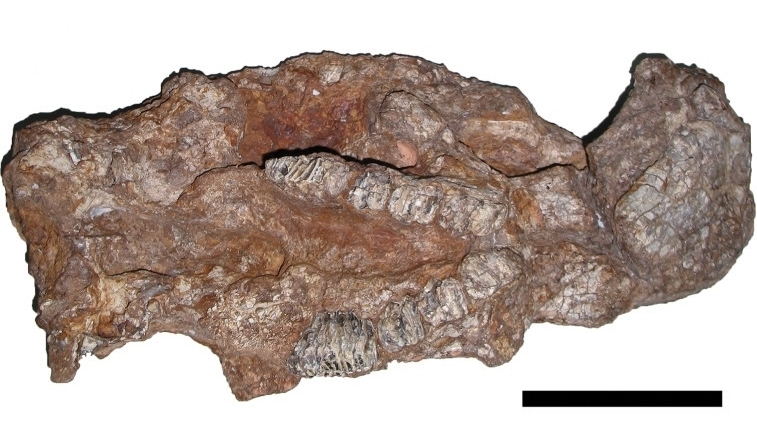
- The skull of Phoberomys pattersoni

Scientific classification
- Kingdom: Animalia
- Phylum: Chordata
- Class: Mammalia
- Order: Rodentia
- Family: †Neoepiblemidae
- Genus: †Phoberomys; Kraglievich, 1926

Species
- See text

= Phoberomys =

Phoberomys Temporal range: Late Miocene (Huayquerian) ~9.0–7.246 Ma

Extinct genus of rodents

Phoberomys is an extinct genus of rodents. Fossil specimens from the Late Miocene period have been discovered in the Ituzaingó Formation of Argentina, the Solimões Formation of Brazil, the Urumaco Formation at Urumaco in Venezuela, and the Pliocene of Peru.

== Species ==
Species in the genus described are:

- Phoberomys burmeisteri (=P. insolita, P. lozanoi, P. minima, P. praecursor)
- Phoberomys pattersoni

Another species, P. bordasii, has been considered as possibly belonging to Neoepiblema.
