= 2018 in paleomammalogy =

This paleomammalogy list records new fossil mammal taxa that were described during the year 2018, as well as notes other significant paleomammalogy discoveries and events which occurred during that year.

== Mammals in general ==
- A study on the morphological diversity of vertebral regions in non-mammalian synapsids, and on its implication for elucidating the evolution of anatomically distinct regions of the mammalian spines, is published by Jones et al. (2018).
- A study on the evolution of the mammalian jaw is published by Lautenschlager et al. (2018), who find no evidence for a concurrent reduction in jaw-joint stress and increase in bite force in key non-mammaliaform taxa in the cynodont–mammaliaform transition.
- A study on the structure and origin of the braincase sidewalls of monotremes, multituberculates and therians, based on data from extant and fossil mammals and non-mammalian cynodonts, is published by Crompton et al. (2018).
- Vertebrate burrows, interpreted as most likely constructed by mammals, are described from the Salt Wash Member of the Upper Jurassic Morrison Formation (Utah, United States) by Raisanen & Hasiotis (2018), who name new ichnotaxa Daimonelix martini and Fractisemita henrii (the latter potentially representing the burrows of a social mammal).
- A study on diversification dynamics of the three major mammalian clades (multituberculates, metatherians and eutherians) in North America across the Cretaceous/Palaeogene boundary is published by Pires et al. (2018).
- A study on changes in mammalian faunal composition and structure during the earliest Paleogene biotic recovery, based on data from four localities in the Hell Creek Formation and Tullock Member of the Fort Union Formation (Montana, United States), is published by Smith et al. (2018).
- A high-resolution age model for mammalian turnover between the To2 and To3 substages of the Torrejonian across the San Juan Basin is presented by Leslie et al. (2018).
- A study on the mammalian extinction selectivity, continental body size distributions, and taxonomic diversity over five time periods spanning the past 125,000 years is published by Smith et al. (2018), who report evidence indicating that larger species of mammals were at greater risk of extinction following the global expansion of hominins over the late Quaternary, and that the degree of size-selectivity of mammalian extinctions in this period was unprecedented in the past 65 million years of mammalian evolution.
- A study on the relationship between extinctions of insular endemic mammal species in the Late Pleistocene and Holocene and their body mass, the size of the island and the first human arrival to the archipelago is published by Kouvari & van der Geer (2018).
- A study on the relationship between diversification rates and climatic niche evolution in mammals is published by Castro-Insua et al. (2018).
- A study on the dietary isotopic signatures recorded in tissues of herbivorous mammals, focusing on extant and fossil sloths, and evaluating the hypothesis that a single isotope enrichment pattern holds for all herbivorous mammals, is published by Tejada-Lara et al. (2018).
- A study on the temporal changes in the spatial differentiation of mammal faunas in China during the Cenozoic, and on the timing of the emergence of the modern spatially structured mammal faunas in China, is published by He et al. (2018).
- A study on the impact of discoveries of fossil mammals that preserve the ancestral or near-ancestral morphologies on resolution of differences between morphological and molecular estimates of mammal phylogeny is published by Beck & Baillie (2018).

== Metatherians ==
- A study on the changes of the global diversity of metatherians through time based on a new dataset of metatherian fossil occurrences is published by Bennett et al. (2018).
- Description of new dentary fossils referable to Eodelphis browni, and a study on the evolution of adaptations to durophagy in stagodontids, is published online by Brannick & Wilson (2018).
- A study on the morphological diversity of sparassodonts and its implications for the structure of the terrestrial carnivore guild from the middle Cenozoic of South America is published by Croft et al. (2018).
- Description of a partial skull of Allqokirus australis from the Paleocene Santa Lucía Formation (Bolivia) and a study on the phylogenetic relationships of this species is published by de Muizon et al. (2018), who name a new metatherian superorder Pucadelphyda.
- A study on the age of thylacine and Tasmanian devil fossils from the mainland Australia and their implications for estimating the time of extinction in mainland Australia for both species is published by White et al. (2018).
- A study on the phylogeography and demographic history of the thylacine during the late Pleistocene and Holocene is published by White, Mitchell & Austin (2018).
- A study on the phylogeography and demographic history of the Tasmanian devil across southern Australia over the last ≈30,000 years, based on genomes from 202 devils representing the extinct mainland and the extant Tasmanian populations, is published by Brüniche–Olsen et al. (2018).
- A study on the phylogenetic relationships of Palaeopotorous priscus is published by den Boer & Kear (2018), who interpret this taxon as a probable non-macropodoid macropodiform marsupial.
- Revision of the taxonomic status of fossil kangaroo relatives attributed to the genera Ganawamaya and Nambaroo is published by Butler et al. (2018), who also describe new fossil material of Ganawamaya couperi (formerly assigned to the genus Nambaroo), Ganawamaya acris and G. aediculis.
- A study on evolution of kangaroos during the last 25 million years, based on data from fossil teeth, is published by Couzens & Prideaux (2018).
- Description of hitherto missing elements in the skeleton of Thylacoleo carnifex and a study on the anatomy and biomechanics of the postcranial skeleton of this species is published by Wells & Camens (2018).

Name	Novelty	Status	Authors	Age	Unit	Location	Notes	Images
Australogale	Gen. et sp. nov	In press	Engelman, Anaya & Croft	Miocene (Serravallian)	Honda Group	Bolivia	A member of Sparassodonta. Genus includes new species A. leptognathus. Announced in 2018; the final version of the article naming it is scheduled to be published in 2020.	
Austropediomys	Gen. et sp. nov	Valid	Carneiro, Oliveira & Goin	Itaboraian	Itaboraí Formation	Brazil	A member of Marsupialiformes belonging to the order Archimetatheria and the superfamily Pediomyiodea. The type species is A. marshalli.	
Bergqvistherium	Gen. et sp. nov	Valid	Carneiro	Itaboraian	Itaboraí Formation	Brazil	A member of Didelphimorphia belonging to the family Protodidelphidae. The type species is B. primigenia.	
Chlorocyon	Gen. et sp. nov	Valid	Engelman et al.	Late Eocene (Mustersan)	Abanico Formation	Chile	A member of Sparassodonta belonging to the group Borhyaenoidea. The type species is C. phantasma.	
Coloradolops	Gen. et sp. nov	Valid	Chornogubsky et al.	Middle Eocene	Quebrada de Los Colorados Formation	Argentina	A member of Polydolopimorphia belonging to the superfamily Bonapartherioidea and to the family Prepidolopidae. Genus includes new species C. cardonensis.	
Fumodelphodon	Gen. et sp. nov	Valid	Cohen	Late Cretaceous (Turonian)	Straight Cliffs Formation	United States (Utah)	A member of Stagodontidae. Genus includes new species F. pulveris.	
Galatiadelphys	Gen. et sp. nov	Valid	Métais et al.	Late middle Eocene	Uzunçarşıdere Formation	Turkey	A member of the family Herpetotheriidae. The type species is G. minor.	
Herpetotherium tabrumi	Sp. nov	Valid	Korth	Late Paleogene (Chadronian)		United States (Montana; Nebraska; North Dakota)		
Hoodootherium	Gen. et sp. nov	Valid	Cohen	Late Cretaceous (Turonian)	Straight Cliffs Formation	United States (Utah)	A member of Stagodontidae. Genus includes new species H. praeceps.	
Miminipossum	Gen. et sp. nov	Valid	Archer et al.	Miocene	Riversleigh World Heritage Area; Wipajiri Formation	Australia	A member of Phalangerida belonging to the new family Miminipossumidae. The type species is M. notioplanetes.	
Orhaniyeia	Gen. et sp. nov	Valid	Métais et al.	Late middle Eocene	Uzunçarşıdere Formation	Turkey	A relative of Anatoliadelphys. The type species is O. nauta.	
Perameles papillon	Sp. nov	Valid	Travouillon & Phillips	Holocene	Nullarbor Plain	Australia	A long-nosed bandicoot.	
Pujatodon	Gen. et sp. nov	In press	Goin et al.	Eocene (Ypresian)	La Meseta Formation	Antarctica (Seymour Island)	Probably a member of Polydolopimorphia. Genus includes new species P. ektopos. Announced in 2018; the final version of the article naming it is scheduled to be published in 2020.	
Rhizophascolonus ngangaba	Sp. nov	Valid	Brewer et al.	Miocene	Riversleigh site	Australia	A wombat.	
Varalphadon janetae	Sp. nov	Valid	Carneiro	Late Cretaceous (late Cenomanian to early Coniacian)	Naturita Formation; Straight Cliffs Formation	United States (Utah)	Possibly a member of Sparassodonta.	

== Eutherians ==
- A study on the causes of the increase of body size in aquatic mammals, based on data on the body masses of living and fossil mammals, is published by Gearty, McClain & Payne (2018).
- A study on large mammal burrows from the Upper Miocene Cerro Azul Formation (Argentina), aiming to infer their likely producers and to interpret the taphonomic processes involved in the preservation of the burrow casts, is published by Cardonatto & Melchor (2018).
- A study on the diet and habitat of the Hemphillian equids Calippus hondurensis, Dinohippus mexicanus and Protohippus gidleyi, the gomphothere Gomphotherium hondurensis, and the llama Hemiauchenia vera from San Gerardo de Limoncito (Costa Rica) is published by Pérez-Crespo et al. (2018).
- A study on the evolution and interconnectedness of the mammal faunas living in the Old World savannas in the Neogene is published by Kaya et al. (2018).
- A study on the changes of the species richness of mammals from the Iberian Peninsula between 15 and 2 million years ago, and on the modulating role of different factors influencing that species richness, is published by Cantalapiedra, Domingo & Domingo (2018).
- Systematic revision of the Miocene mammalian faunas of the Republic of Macedonia, known from fossils stored in the Macedonian Museum of Natural History, Skopje, is published by Spassov et al. (2018).
- A study on the paleomagnetic chronology of the fossil-bearing strata and on the age of the late Miocene mammal fossils from the Xining basin (Tibetan Plateau, China) is published by Hen et al. (2018).
- Faith (2018) evaluates the aridity index, a widely used technique for reconstructing local paleoclimate and water deficits from oxygen isotope composition of fossil mammal teeth, arguing that in some taxa altered drinking behavior (influencing oxygen isotope composition of teeth) might have been caused by dietary change rather than water deficits.
- A revision of the mammal fauna from the Miocene site of Bukwa (Uganda) and a study on the age of this fauna is published by Cote et al. (2018), who interpret their finding as indicating that a significant faunal turnover may have occurred in East Africa between 20 and 19 million years ago.
- A study on changes of the species- and genus-level diversity of large mammals in the Omo-Turkana Basin (eastern Africa) in the Pliocene and Pleistocene is published by Du & Alemseged (2018).
- The primary description and analysis of the so-called GD A faunal assemblage from the Gondolin Cave (South Africa) is published by Adams (2018).
- A study on the diet of large mammals from the Pleistocene sediments at Olduvai Gorge (Tanzania), as indicated by tooth wear and stable isotope data from fossil teeth, is published by Uno et al. (2018).
- A study on the diet of the most abundant ungulate taxa from the Oldowan site HWK EE (Olduvai Gorge, Tanzania), as indicated by tooth wear and stable isotope analyses, is published by Rivals et al. (2018).
- Description of new mammal and fish remains from the Olduvai Gorge site, comparing the mammal assemblage from this site to the present mammal community of Serengeti, and a study on their implications for reconstructing the paleoecology of this site at ~1.7–1.4 million years ago, is published by Bibi et al. (2018).
- A study on the distance of seed dispersal by extant and extinct mammalian frugivores and on the impact of the extinction of Pleistocene megafauna on seed dispersal is published by Pires et al. (2018).
- A study on the diet and habitat of ungulates from the Middle Pleistocene site of Fontana Ranuccio (Italy) as indicated by their tooth wear is published by Strani et al. (2018).
- A study on the response of large ungulates to the palaeoenvironmental changes that occurred at the passage between the Gelasian and Calabrian in the Italian Peninsula, based on the dental wear patterns and hypsodonty of the ungulates from the fossil assemblage of Olivola (Aulla, Italy), is published by Strani et al. (2018).
- A study on the ungulate and carnivoran carrying capacity of the late Early and early Middle Pleistocene ecosystems of Europe is published by Rodríguez & Mateos (2018).
- A study on the changes of vegetation in the temperate zone of Asia during an interval containing the Mid-Pleistocene Transition, ≈1.2–0.7 million years ago, as indicated by pollen data from a drilling core from the North China Plain, as well as on their effect on the large mammal fauna is published by Xinying et al. (2018).
- A study evaluating how the mammoth steppe ecosystem with its expected low vegetation productivity managed to support a high diversity and density of large mammalian herbivores during the Last Glacial Maximum is published by Zhu et al. (2018).
- A study modeling spatial and temporal patterns of habitat suitability for 24 megafauna species and Homo sapiens in the Late Pleistocene in Eurasia is published by Carotenuto et al. (2018), who state that extinct herbivorous megafauna species were consistently rare within habitat patches optimal for humans.
- A study on eastern African herbivore communities spanning the past 7 million years, aiming to test the hypothesis that tool-bearing, meat-eating hominins contributed to the demise of megaherbivores prior to the emergence of Homo sapiens, is published by Faith et al. (2018).
- A study on the age of the Pleistocene Linyi Fauna, and on its implications for establishing the chronological sequencing of the mammalian faunas on the Chinese Loess Plateau, is published by Qiu et al. (2018).
- Studies on the structure of mammal communities from the Paleolithic sites in the Anui River Basin and the Charysh River Basin are published by Agadjanian & Shunkov (2018).
- A study on the morphology of the skulls of extant and extinct elephants and hippos, evaluating the hypothesis that the skulls of extinct island dwarf members of these groups were pedomorphic, is published by van der Geer et al. (2018).
- The first evidence of bears scavenging on horses in the South American fossil record is reported from the Pleistocene deposits of the Gruta do Urso cave (Brazil) by Avilla et al. (2018).
- A study on the population dynamics of North American humans and large mammals preceding megafaunal extinctions at the end of the Pleistocene, and on their implications for inferring the causes of extinction of large mammals in North America at the end of the Pleistocene, is published by Broughton & Weitzel (2018).
- A study on a hybrid offspring of the grey seal and ringed seal born in 1929 in Stockholm zoo, and on its implications for paleontological research, is published by Savriama et al. (2018), who evaluate whether fossil specimens with morphology intermediate between two taxa could potentially be hybrids, and estimate the overall hybridization potential in mammal evolution, including human ancestry.

=== Xenarthrans ===
- A study on the relationship between humerus shape and the modes of exploring substrate among extant and fossil members of Pilosa is published by de Oliveira & Santos (2018).
- A study on the species distribution of 15 fossil xenarthrans from the late Pleistocene of South America is published by Varela et al. (2018).
- A study on the microwear patterns in the teeth of the Oligocene sloths Orophodon hapaloides and Octodontotherium grande, as well its implications for inferring the diet of these taxa, is published by Kalthoff & Green (2018).
- A study on the anatomy of the ear region in Glossotherium robustum and on the evolution of the inner ear anatomy in the xenarthrans is published by Boscaini et al. (2018).
- A study on the internal morphology of the skull of Glossotherium robustum is published online by Boscaini et al. (2018).
- A skull of a megatheriid sloth belonging to a member or a relative of the genus Proeremotherium is described from the Pliocene San Gregorio Formation (Venezuela) by Carlini et al. (2018).
- A study on the fusion of anterior thoracic vertebrae in Pleistocene ground sloths is published online by Tambusso et al. (2018).
- A study on the feet anatomy of the fossil sloths Megatherium and Eremotherium, as well as its implications for inferring the degree to which their feet were habitually inverted, is published by Toledo et al. (2018).
- New remains (skull and humeri) of Megathericulus patagonicus are described from the middle Miocene fossiliferous locality of Quebrada Honda (Bolivia) by Brandoni et al. (2018).
- New fossil remains of Megatherium filholi are described from the late Pleistocene sediments of Buenos Aires Province (Argentina) by Agnolin et al. (2018), who revalidate M. filholi as a distinct species.
- A study on the bone structure of the skull of Thalassocnus and on the evolution of bone mass increase in extinct aquatic sloths is published by Amson, Billet & de Muizon (2018).
- A study on the ontogenetic, intraspecific and interspecific variations in the anatomy of the occipital region of the skulls of members of the family Mylodontidae from the late Pleistocene of Argentina is published by Brambilla & Ibarra (2018).
- A study on the phylogenetic relationships of Mylodon darwinii, based on mitogenomic and nuclear data, is published by Delsuc et al. (2018).
- A study on the morphology and histology of glyptodont osteoderms from the Gruta do Urso cave (Brazil), representing the first juvenile specimen of Glyptotherium described from the Late Pleistocene of South America, is published by Luna et al. (2018).
- Taxonomic revision of glyptodonts from Uruguay belonging to the tribe Plohophorini is published by Toriño & Perea (2018).
- A study comparing the morphology of South American species of Glyptodon and Glyptotherium, in order to identify diagnostic differences and potential synapomorphies, is published by Zurita et al. (2018).
- A study on the anatomy of the hyoid apparatus of two glyptodontid specimens from Lujanian sediments of the Pampean Region (Argentina), assigned to the genus Panochthus, is published by Zamorano et al. (2018).
- First cases of parasitism by fleas and other cutaneous lesions on osteoderms, carapace and caudal tube fragments of large fossil cingulates, including Panochthus, Glyptotherium and Pachyarmatherium, are reported by de Lima & Porpino (2018).

Name	Novelty	Status	Authors	Age	Unit	Location	Notes	Images
Neoglyptatelus uruguayensis	Sp. nov	Valid	Fernicola et al.	Late Miocene	Camacho Formation	Uruguay	A member of Cingulata.	
Pattersonocnus	Gen. et sp. nov	Valid	Rincón et al.	Late Miocene	Urumaco Formation	Venezuela	A sloth belonging to the family Megalonychidae. The type species is P. diazgameroi.	
Urumacocnus	Gen. et sp. nov	Valid	Rincón et al.	Late Miocene	Urumaco Formation	Venezuela	A sloth belonging to the family Megalonychidae. The type species is U. urbanii.	
Xibalbaonyx microcaninus	Sp. nov	Valid	Stinnesbeck, Frey & Stinnesbeck	Late Pleistocene		Mexico	A ground sloth belonging to the family Megalonychidae.	

=== Afrotherians ===
- A study on the anatomy and phylogenetic relationships of the elephant shrew Chambius kasserinensis based on known and newly described fossil remains from the Eocene of Tunisia is published by Tabuce (2018).
- Description of the anatomy of middle and inner ears of the golden mole Namachloris arenatans from the Palaeogene of Namibia is published by Mason, Bennett & Pickford (2018).
- A revision of sirenian fossils and taxa from the Miocene Chesapeake Group (eastern United States) is published by Domning (2018).
- A method to estimate the body mass of extinct proboscideans on the basis of skull remains is presented by Jukar, Lyons & Uhen (2018).
- A study on the evolution of the cheek teeth displacement mechanism in elephantiform proboscideans is published by Sanders (2018).
- New fossil material of Choerolophodon corrugatus is described from the Dhok Pathan Formation (Pakistan) by Abbas et al. (2018).
- Phytoliths preserved in the dental calculus of specimens of Gomphotherium connexum and Gomphotherium steinheimense from the Miocene Halamagai Formation (northern Junggar Basin, China) are described by Wu et al. (2018), who interpret their findings as indicating that G. connexum was an obligate browser or a mixed feeder, while G.steinheimense may have had a more grass-dominated feeding preference, and was the earliest-known proboscidean with a predominantly grazing habit.
- A study on the diet and habitat of Notiomastodon platensis from Central Chile is published by González-Guarda et al. (2018).
- A study on the diet of the Columbian mammoths, pygmy mammoths and American mastodons as indicated by tooth wear is published by Smith & Desantis (2018).
- Late Pleistocene proboscidean fossils, including fossils of Stegodon orientalis and the Asian elephant (Elephas maximus), are described from the Yangjiawan caves (Jiangxi, China) by Tong et al. (2018).
- A study evaluating the validity of the taxon Archidiskodon meridionalis gromovi is published by Baygusheva & Titov (2018).
- A study on members of the genus Archidiskodon from the Lower Pleistocene sediments of the South of Western Siberia (Kuznetsk Basin), and their implications for early evolution of the Archidiskodon–Mammuthus lineage, is published by Foronova (2018).
- Redescription of the southern mammoth remains from the Pleistocene site of Huéscar-1 (Baza basin, Granada, Spain), and a study on the implications of these remains for inferring the time and mode of the replacement of the southern mammoth by the steppe mammoth by the end of the Early Pleistocene, is published by Ros-Montoya et al. (2018).
- A study on permafrost-preserved Siberian woolly mammoths, aiming to measure testosterone in the hair samples of the studied specimens, is published by Koren et al. (2018).
- A study on the age and origin of the Berelyokh mammoth site in northeast Siberia is published by Lozhkin & Anderson (2018); the study is subsequently criticized by Pitulko et al. (2019).
- A study on changes in woolly mammoth range in Europe during MIS 2 is published by Nadachowski et al. (2018).
- A study on the life conditions of woolly mammoths from the Upper Paleolithic site Kraków Spadzista (Poland) is published by Haynes, Klimowicz & Wojtal (2018).
- A study on changes in the specific niche of the woolly mammoth in the central East European plains shortly before their extinction, as indicated by data on the carbon and nitrogen isotope composition of mammoth bones from the Epigravettian site of Mezhyrich and from contemporaneous and nearby sites of Buzhanka 2, Eliseevichi and Yudinovo, is published by Drucker et al. (2018).
- An overview of parasite finds in woolly mammoth specimens is published by Serdyuk & Maschenko (2018).
- A study on the importance of mammoths as a source of dietary omega-3 fatty acids in Paleolithic societies, as indicated by data on fats from several frozen mammoths found in the permafrost of Siberia, and on the cultural significance of mammoths for hominins, is published by Guil-Guerrero et al. (2018).
- A study on the evolutionary history of the family Elephantidae based on 14 genomes from extant and fossil elephantids and from the American mastodon is published by Palkopoulou et al. (2018).

Name	Novelty	Status	Authors	Age	Unit	Location	Notes	Images
Elephas (Palaeoloxodon) cephallonicus	Sp. nov	Disputed	Theodorou et al.	Pleistocene		Greece	A dwarf endemic middle sized elephant from the island of Cephalonia. Athanassiou, van der Geer & Lyras (2019) considered this species to be a junior synonym of the straight-tusked elephant (Palaeoloxodon antiquus).	
Promicrogale	Gen. et sp. nov	Valid	Pickford	Early Miocene	Elisabeth Bay Formation	Namibia	A tenrec. The type species is P. namibiensis.	
Sobrarbesiren	Gen. et sp. nov	Valid	Díaz-Berenguer et al.	Eocene (Lutetian)	Sobrarbe Formation	Spain	A sirenian of uncertain phylogenetic placement. The type species is S. cardieli.	
Stylolophus	Gen. et sp. nov	Valid	Gheerbrant, Schmitt & Kocsis	Eocene (Ypresian)	Ouled Abdoun Basin	Morocco	An early member of Embrithopoda. The type species is S. minor.	

=== Bats ===
- A review of the distribution of sesamoids in extant bats, as well as in Eocene bats Onychonycteris finneyi and Icaronycteris index, is published by Amador et al. (2018).
- A study on the phylogeny of extant and fossil short-faced bats (leaf-nosed bats belonging to the subfamily Stenodermatinae and the subtribe Stenodermatina) and on the ancestral distributions of the group, evaluating whether this group was more likely to originate on Antilles or on the American mainland, is published by Tavares et al. (2018).
- An exceptionally preserved adult specimen of Egyptian fruit bat, morphologically more similar to Egyptian than to East African or Middle Eastern populations, is described from the early Holocene deposits in Hoq Cave (Socotra Island, Yemen) by Van Damme et al. (2018).

Name	Novelty	Status	Authors	Age	Unit	Location	Notes	Images
Anatolianycteris	Gen. et sp. nov	Valid	Jones et al.	Eocene (late Lutetian)	Uzunçarşidere Formation	Turkey	A member of the family Palaeochiropterygidae. The type species is A. insularis.	
Mops kerio	Sp. nov	Valid	Gunnell & Manthi	Pliocene	Kanapoi site	Kenya	A species of Mops. Announced in 2018; the final version of the article naming it was published in 2020.	
Mops turkwellensis	Sp. nov	Valid	Gunnell & Manthi	Pliocene	Kanapoi site	Kenya	A species of Mops. Announced in 2018; the final version of the article naming it was published in 2020.	
Pteronotus trevorjacksoni	Sp. nov	Valid	Van Den Hoek Ostende, Van Oijen & Donovan	Late Pleistocene		Jamaica	A species of Pteronotus.	
Rousettus pattersoni	Sp. nov	Valid	Gunnell & Manthi	Pliocene	Kanapoi site	Kenya	A species of Rousettus. Announced in 2018; the final version of the article naming it was published in 2020.	
Saccolaimus kenyensis	Sp. nov	Valid	Gunnell & Manthi	Pliocene	Kanapoi site	Kenya	A species of Saccolaimus. Announced in 2018; the final version of the article naming it was published in 2020.	
Turkanycteris	Gen. et sp. nov	Valid	Gunnell & Manthi	Pliocene	Kanapoi site	Kenya	A very large fruit bat, larger than all extant fruit bats other than some species of Pteropus and Hypsignathus. Genus includes new species T. harrisi. Announced in 2018; the final version of the article naming it was published in 2020.	
Vulcanops	Gen. et sp. nov	Valid	Hand et al.	Early Miocene	Bannockburn Formation	New Zealand	A New Zealand short-tailed bat. The type species is V. jennyworthyae.	

=== Odd-toed ungulates ===
- A study on the temporal and spatial distribution of Paleogene odd-toed ungulate species from the Erlian Basin (China) is published by Bai et al. (2018).
- Tooth anomalies in two juvenile specimens of the Miocene rhinoceros Prosantorhinus germanicus are described by Böhmer & Rössner (2018), who discuss probable causes of these anomalies.
- A jaw of Stephanorhinus kirchbergensis is described from the Mus Khaya locality on the Yana River in the Sakha Republic (Russia) by Shpansky & Boeskorov (2018), representing the northernmost occurrence of this species; the authors also interpret Coelodonta jacuticus as the junior synonym of the woolly rhinoceros (Coelodonta antiquitatis).
- A study on the morphology of the postcranial skeleton of Teleolophus, based on new remains from the Eocene of China, is published by Bai, Wang & Meng (2018).
- A study on the diet of the Miocene rhinoceros Diceros gansuensis, as indicated by data from starch granules found in dental calculus of a specimen from the Miocene Linxia Basin (Gansu, China), is published by Chen et al. (2018).
- New fossil material of Elasmotherium peii is described from the Lower Pleistocene of the Shanshenmiaozui site (Nihewan Basin, China) by Tong, Chen & Zhang (2018).
- A study on the digit reduction in the evolution of horses is published by Solounias et al. (2018).
- A study testing for the presence of broad-scale habitat partitioning in fossil horses of North America is published by Parker, McHorse & Pierce (2018).
- A revised diagnosis and a description of the anatomy of the Miocene hipparionine species Sivalhippus ptychodus and S. platyodus from China is published by Sun et al. (2018).
- A study on the ontogeny (mineralization, eruption, and replacement patterns) of postcanine teeth of members of the genus Hipparion from Cerro de los Batallones (Spain) is published by Domingo et al. (2018).
- A study on the bone growth pattern of different-sized hipparionins as indicated by bone histology, and on its implications for inferring the possible mechanisms and causes underlying trends in size reduction of European hipparions in the late Miocene, is published by Orlandi-Oliveras et al. (2018).
- Review of fossils of members of the family Equidae from the Pleistocene site of lac Karâr (Algeria) is published by Sam (2018).
- A study on the diet and habitat of Pleistocene members of the genera Equus and Hippidion from southern United States, Mexico and South America, as indicated by carbon and oxygen isotopic data, is published by Pérez-Crespo et al. (2018).
- A study evaluating how the geographic distribution of horses changed through time in the Late Pleistocene and Holocene, based on paleontological and archeological horse finds across the whole of Eurasia evaluated in association with paleoclimatic and paleoenvironmental reconstructions for the Late Quaternary, is published by Leonardi et al. (2018).

Name	Novelty	Status	Authors	Age	Unit	Location	Notes	Images
Ardynia ordosensis	Sp. nov	Valid	Bai, Wang & Zhang	Late Eocene		China	A member of the family Hyracodontidae.	
Chilotherium licenti	Sp. nov	Valid	Sun, Li & Deng	Late Miocene		China		
Danjiangia lambdodon	Sp. nov		Bai, Wang & Meng	Earliest Eocene	Hengyang Basin	China	A primitive perissodactyl; possibly member of Lambdotheriidae or a primitive member of Brontotheriidae.	
Epimanteoceras mae	Sp. nov	Valid	Li	Eocene (Irdinmanhan)	Üqbulak Formation	China	A member of the family Brontotheriidae.	
Erihippus	Gen. et sp. nov		Bai, Wang & Meng	Earliest Eocene	Lingcha Formation	China	A member of the family Equidae. The type species is E. tingae.	
Forstercooperia ulanshirehensis	Sp. nov	Valid	Wang et al.	Eocene	Irdin Manha Formation; Ulan Shireh Formation	China		
Hispanotherium wushanense	Sp. nov	Valid	Sun et al.	Miocene	Wushan Subbasin	China		
Maobrontops	Gen. et sp. nov	Valid	Averianov et al.	Late Eocene	Youganwo Formation	China	A member of the family Brontotheriidae. The type species is M. paganus.	
Sellamynodon	Gen. et comb. nov	Valid	Tissier et al.	Late Eocene or Early Oligocene		Romania	A member of the family Amynodontidae. The type species is "Cadurcodon" zimborensis Codrea & Şuraru (1989).	
Shanxihippus	Gen. et comb. nov	Valid	Bernor et al.	Late Miocene		China	A member of the family Equidae belonging to the tribe Hipparionini. The type species is "Hipparion" dermatorhinum Sefve (1927).	

=== Even-toed ungulates ===
- A study evaluating whether tooth measurements of the kind typically used in the systematics of Merycoidodontoidea can diagnose between related, similarly sized even-toed ungulates is published by Emery-Wetherell & Davis (2018).
- Description of the fossil material of the camel species Camelus thomasi from the Pleistocene locality of Tighennif (Algeria) and a study on the phylogenetic relationships of this species is published by Martini & Geraads (2018).
- A study on the diet of extinct peccaries in Florida from the late Miocene throughout the Pleistocene, as indicated by tooth microwear and stable carbon isotopes, is published by Bradham et al. (2018).
- Fossils of the peccaries Mylohyus elmorei and Prosthennops serus are described from the Gray Fossil Site (Tennessee, United States) by Doughty et al. (2018), representing the first occurrence of these species from the Appalachians reported so far.
- Partial skull of a suid assigned to the genus Metridiochoerus is described from the Malapa Fossil Site (South Africa) by Lazagabaster et al. (2018).
- Description of a new mandible of Sus strozzii from the Early Pleistocene of Pantalla (central Italy), as well as a study on the phylogenetic relationships of living and fossil Eurasian and African members of Suinae, is published by Cherin et al. (2018).
- A study on the evolution of hypsodonty in ruminants as indicated by phylogeny of ruminants, estimated ancestral ruminant diets and habitats, and fossil record of grasslands is published by Toljagić et al. (2018).
- A study comparing the exclusivity and magnitude of changes in diversification rates during the evolution of ruminants and other lineages of placental mammals is published by Rossi, Mello & Schrago (2018).
- Fossils of the chevrotain Dorcatherium crassum, including a skull and teeth remains, are described from the Miocene (Langhian) of the Faluns Auger quarry (Contres, France) by Mennecart et al. (2018).
- Croitor, Sanz & Daura (2018) report the findings from a morphological and demographic analysis of remains of the endemic deer Haploidoceros mediterraneus from the Late Pleistocene of the Cova del Rinoceront (Spain).
- A study on the feeding habits of Morenelaphus as indicated by tooth enamel microwear is published by Rotti et al. (2018).
- A study on the dietary plasticity of specimens of Eucladoceros ctenoides from eight middle and late Villafranchian localities in Europe, as indicated by tooth microwear, is published by Berlioz et al. (2018).
- Antler remains of the wapiti (Cervus canadensis) are described from the Late Paleolithic site of Climăuți II (Moldova) by Croitor & Obada (2018), confirming the presence of wapiti in the Late Pleistocene of western Eurasia.
- Pfeiffer-Deml (2018) raises fossil fallow deer Dama dama geiselana to the rank of a separate species Dama geiselana, and compares its antler and skeletal characteristics with other fossil and recent fallow deers.
- A study on the diet of the Irish elk (Megaloceros giganteus), as indicated by data from masticated plant remains preserved in deep folds of a molar found in sandy deposits of the North Sea, is published by van Geel et al. (2018).
- Description of new fossils of Propalaeoryx stromeri from the Miocene of Namibia, redescription of the skull anatomy of Propalaeoryx and a study on the phylogenetic relationships of this taxon is published by Sánchez et al. (2018).
- A study on the dietary preferences of extant and fossil members of the family Giraffidae as indicated by teeth microwear is published by Merceron, Colyn & Geraads (2018).
- Giraffe tracks are described from the Pleistocene Waenhuiskrans Formation (Bredasdorp Group, South Africa) by Helm et al. (2018), increasing known historical range of giraffes.
- A study on the diet and habitat of Leptomeryx from the Eocene (Uintan) Yolomécatl Formation (Mexico) as indicated by tooth enamel carbon and oxygen isotopic relationships will be published by Ferrusquía-Villafranca et al. (2018).
- A study on the dietary preferences of members of the tribe Tragelaphini from the Plio-Pleistocene Shungura Formation (Lower Omo Valley, Ethiopia) as indicated by their tooth wear is published by Blondel et al. (2018).
- Description of the late Miocene gazelle fossils from the Qingyang area (Gansu, China), and a review of the taxonomy of gazelle species known from this area, is published by Li et al. (2018).
- A study on the dietary ecology of Antidorcas bondi (an extinct relative of the springbok) is published by Ecker & Lee-Thorp (2018).
- A study on the impact of climate changes on the evolution of body size of members of the genus Bison based on the data from extant and fossil bisons is published by Martin, Mead & Barboza (2018).
- A study on the dietary preference and habitat use of three Mexican samples of Bison antiquus, as indicated by tooth wear, is published by Díaz-Sibaja et al. (2018).
- A study on mandibular shape variation in extant bovids with different feeding preferences, and on its implications for inferring dietary adaptations of fossil bovids from the Upper Laetolil Beds and Upper Ndolanya Beds of Laetoli (Tanzania) and the degree of vegetation cover at Laetoli during early hominin occupation, is published by Forrest, Plummer & Raaum (2018).
- A study evaluating when the island of Sulawesi (Indonesia) gained its modern shape and size, and determining the timings of diversification of the three largest endemic mammals on the island (the babirusa, the Celebes warty pig and the anoa) is published by Frantz et al. (2018).

Name	Novelty	Status	Authors	Age	Unit	Location	Notes	Images
Aumelasia sudrei	Sp. nov	Valid	Erfurt in Godinot et al.	Eocene		France	A member of the family Dichobunidae.	
Bachitherium thraciensis	Sp. nov	Valid	Mennecart et al.	Eocene (latest Bartonian or early Priabonian)		Bulgaria; Serbia?	An early ruminant belonging to the group Tragulina and the family Bachitheriidae.	
Candiacervus devosi	Sp. nov	Valid	Van der Geer	Late Pleistocene		Greece	An Old World deer.	
Candiacervus listeri	Sp. nov	Valid	Van der Geer	Late Pleistocene		Greece	An Old World deer.	
Candiacervus reumeri	Sp. nov	Valid	Van der Geer	Late Pleistocene		Greece	An Old World deer.	
"Dorcatherium" namaquensis	Sp. nov	Valid	Sánchez et al.	Middle Miocene		Namibia	A chevrotain.	
Lophiobunodon hookeri	Sp. nov	Valid	Godinot et al.	Eocene		France	A member of the family Choeropotamidae.	
Orycterochoerus	Gen. et sp. nov	Valid	Pickford & Morales	Early Miocene		Spain	A member of Suoidea belonging to the family Doliochoeridae. The type species is O. alferezi.	
Paenanthracotherium	Gen. et sp. et comb. nov	Valid	Scherler, Lihoreau & Becker	Oligocene		France; Germany; Pakistan; Romania; Switzerland	An anthracotheriine hippopotamoid. The type species is P. bergeri; genus also includes "Anthracotherium" hippoideum Rütimeyer (1857) and "Brachyodus" strategus Forster-Cooper (1913).	
Parmularius maasaicus	Sp. nov	Valid	Bibi et al.	Pleistocene	Olduvai Gorge site	Tanzania	A member of the family Bovidae belonging to the tribe Alcelaphini.	
Protodichobune hellmundi	Sp. nov	Valid	Erfurt in Godinot et al.	Eocene		France	A member of the family Dichobunidae.	
Rucervus gigans	Sp. nov		Croitor	Early Pleistocene	Platanochori Formation	Greece	A species of Rucervus.	
Rucervus radulescui	Sp. nov		Croitor	Early Pleistocene	Platanochori Formation	Greece; Moldova; Romania; Russia	A species of Rucervus.	
Stryfnotherium	Gen. et sp. nov	Valid	Kostopoulos & Soubise	Late Miocene		Greece	A member of the family Bovidae. Genus includes new species S. exophthalmon.	

=== Cetaceans ===
- A study assessing the lumbar mobility in archaeocetes is published by Bebej & Smith (2018).
- A study on the anatomy of the auditory region of the skull of protocetids as indicated by fossils from the Eocene of Togo is published by Mourlam & Orliac (2018).
- A study on the teeth complexity across fossil and living cetaceans, attempting to identify a trend toward dental simplicity through the Neogene, is published by Peredo, Peredo & Pyenson (2018).
- A quantitative analysis and a study on the evolution of cranial telescoping (sliding of facial bones over each other, in much the same way as long sections of telescope slide over shorter sections) in toothed whales is published by Churchill et al. (2018).
- A study on the morphology of the bony labyrinth in extant and fossil toothed whales is published by Costeur et al. (2018), who interpret their findings as indicating that the bony labyrinth provides key information both about phylogeny and habitat preferences of members of this group of cetaceans.
- New fossils of members of the genus Agorophius are described from the Oligocene Chandler Bridge Formation (South Carolina, United States) by Boessenecker & Geisler (2018), providing new information on ontogenetic variation and sensory anatomy in Agorophius.
- A study on the life history and ecology of Neogene members of Physeteroidea known from the Lee Creek Mine (North Carolina, United States) based on the examination of their teeth is published by Gilbert, Ivany & Uhen (2018).
- Description of postcranial remains of the stem-beaked whale Messapicetus gregarius from the Miocene (Tortonian) of Peru is published by Ramassamy et al. (2018), who also propose a reconstruction of the musculature of the neck and forelimb of the species.
- An almost complete skull of Llanocetus denticrenatus is described from the Eocene La Meseta Formation (Antarctica) by Fordyce & Marx (2018), who also study the phylogenetic relationships and likely feeding strategy of this species, as well as its implications for inferring the origin of baleen and gigantism in baleen whales.
- A study on the morphology of the membranous labyrinth in extinct and extant baleen whales and their ancestors, focusing on Late Miocene baleen whales from Adygea (Russia), is published by Tarasenko et al. (2018).
- An ontogenetically young specimen of Herpetocetus is described from the lower part of the Horokaoshirarika Formation (Hokkaido, Japan) by Tanaka & Watanabe (2018), representing the only record of Miocene Herpetocetinae from the western Pacific reported so far.
- Partial periotic bone of a member of the genus Caperea is described from the latest Miocene of southern Australia by Marx et al. (2018), representing the oldest record of this genus reported so far.
- A study on the anatomy of cochleae of extant and extinct cetaceans, the relationships of cochlear shape and the frequency ranges heard by cetaceans, and their implications for determining the occurrence of very low frequency and infrasonic hearing in fossil baleen whales is published by Ritsche et al. (2018).
- Oxygen-isotope analysis of a whale barnacle specimen collected from early Pleistocene deposits of Apulia (Italy) is published by Collareta et al. (2018), who interpret their findings as indicating that the barnacle lived on a cetacean that seasonally migrated towards high-latitude areas outside the Mediterranean.

Name	Novelty	Status	Authors	Age	Unit	Location	Notes	Images
Aondelphis	Gen. et sp. nov	Valid	Viglino et al.	Early Miocene	Gaimán Formation	Argentina	A member of Platanistoidea. The type species is A. talen.	
Ciuciulea	Gen. et sp. nov	Valid	Gol'din	Middle Miocene		Moldova	A member of the family Cetotheriidae. The type species is C. davidi.	
Ediscetus	Gen. et sp. nov	Valid	Albright, Sanders & Geisler	Oligocene (Rupelian)	Ashley Formation	United States (South Carolina)	An early toothed whale, slightly outside the odontocete crown group. Genus includes new species E. osbornei.	
Eschrichtius akishimaensis	Sp. nov	Valid	Kimura, Hasegawa & Kohno	Early Pleistocene		Japan	A relative of the gray whale.	
Haborodelphis	Gen. et sp. nov	Valid	Ichishima et al.	Early Pliocene		Japan	A member of the family Monodontidae. Genus includes new species H. japonicus.	
Khoikhoicetus kergueleni	Sp. nov	Valid	Lambert et al.	Uncertain, possibly Miocene		Seafloor 370 km SWW to Kerguelen Islands	A beaked whale belonging to the subfamily Hyperoodontinae.	
Kwanzacetus	Gen. et sp. nov	Valid	Lambert et al.	Late Miocene		Angola	A member of the family Iniidae. The type species is K. khoisani.	
Macrosqualodelphis	Gen. et sp. nov	Valid	Bianucci et al.	Miocene (Burdigalian)	Chilcatay Formation	Peru	A member of the family Squalodelphinidae. The type species is M. ukupachai.	
Maiabalaena	Gen. et sp. nov	Valid	Peredo et al.	Oligocene (Rupelian)	Alsea Formation	United States	An early baleen whale. The type species is M. nesbittae.	
Salishicetus	Gen. et sp. nov	Valid	Peredo & Pyenson	Late Oligocene	Lincoln Creek Formation	United States (Washington)	A member of the family Aetiocetidae. The type species is S. meadi.	
Taikicetus	Gen. et sp. nov	Valid	Tanaka, Ando & Sawamura	Middle Miocene	Hikatagawa Formation	Japan	A cetotheriid-like baleen whale. The type species is T. inouei.	
Tlaxcallicetus	Gen. et sp. nov	Valid	Hernández Cisneros	Late Oligocene	El Cien Formation	Mexico	A member of Chaeomysticeti of uncertain phylogenetic placement. The type species is T. guaycurae.	
Toipahautea	Gen. et sp. nov	Valid	Tsai & Fordyce	Oligocene (Chattian)	Kokoamu Greensand	New Zealand	An archaic baleen whale. The type species is T. waitaki.	
Wimahl	Gen. et sp. nov	Valid	Peredo, Uhen & Nelson	Early Miocene	Astoria Formation	United States (Washington)	A member of the family Kentriodontidae. Genus includes new species W. chinookensis.	

=== Carnivorans ===
- A systematic examination of members of the family Canidae from the Hemphillian Mehrten Formation (California, United States) is published by Balisi et al. (2018).
- A study evaluating whether body size and the occurrence of skull and teeth traits related to the dietary specialization were correlated with species duration and locality coverage in North American canids over 40 million years of their evolution is published by Balisi, Casey & Van Valkenburgh (2018).
- A study on the teeth microwear in extant gray wolves and coyotes, and its implications for dietary studies of extant and fossil canids, is published by Tanis, DeSantis & Terry (2018).
- Description of a sample of coprolites from the Upper Miocene Mehrten Formation (California, United States), likely produced by Borophagus parvus, and a study on their implications for inferring the diet of this species, is published by Wang et al. (2018).
- Revision of the taxonomy and relative age of the Javanese canid fossils will be published by van der Geer, Lyras & Volmer (2018).
- A study on the phylogenetic relationships of extant and fossil members of the subfamily Caninae is published by Zrzavý et al. (2018).
- Description of new fossils of members of the genus Nyctereutes from the Pliocene site of Layna (Spain), and a study on their implications for inferring the evolutionary history of Nyctereutes in Eurasia, is published by Bartolini Lucenti, Rook & Morales (2018).
- Fossil footprint of a jackal-like predator is described from the Sorbas Member of the Sorbas Basin (Spain) by McCann et al. (2018).
- Revision of fossils attributed to the species Canis variabilis and a study on the morphotype variability of the Pleistocene members of the genus Canis is published by Jiangzuo et al. (2018), who considered C. variabilis to be a subspecies of Canis mosbachensis.
- A study on the morphological diversity of the limb bones of fossil and modern North American gray wolves is published by Tomiya & Meachen (2018).
- A study on the morphological and morphometric variability of late Pleistocene gray wolves from Avetrana (Italy) in comparison to other populations from northern and southern Italy, as well as from other localities in Europe, is published by Mecozzi & Bartolini Lucenti (2018).
- A study on the evolutionary history of the domestic dogs living in the Americas before the arrival of European colonists, based on data from sequenced mitochondrial and nuclear genomes from ancient North American and Siberian dogs from time frames spanning ≈9000 years, is published by Ní Leathlobhair et al. (2018).
- A study on the mitochondrial DNA sequences of ancient dogs from 37 archaeological sites across Eurasia (from the Upper Paleolithic to the Bronze Age), testing the hypothesis that dogs associated with Near Eastern farmers were brought into Europe alongside other domestic animals during the Neolithic, is published by Ollivier et al. (2018).
- A study on the age of dingo bones from Madura Cave on the Nullarbor Plain (Australia), and its implications for inferring the likely rate of dingo spread throughout Australia from their point of arrival, is published by Balme, O'Connor & Fallon (2018).
- The complete mitochondrial genome of a ~22,000-year-old giant panda specimen from the Cizhutuo Cave (Leye County, Guangxi, China) is sequenced by Ko et al. (2018).
- A study on the age of the fossil remains of short-faced bears (Arctodus simus) and brown bears (Ursus arctos) from Pellucidar Cave (Vancouver Island, Canada) is published by Steffen & Fulton (2018).
- A study on the living conditions of Pleistocene bears (belonging to the species Ursus ingressus) from Jaskinia Niedźwiedzia (Bear Cave) in Kletno (Poland) as indicated by the frequency of Harris lines in their bones is published by Nowakowski (2018).
- A study on the diet of the cave bears from four MIS 3 sites in the Carpathian Mountains, based on isotopic data, is published by Robu et al. (2018).
- Multifold coverage genomic data from four Late Pleistocene cave bears is presented by Barlow et al. (2018), who report that cave bears hybridized with brown bears during the Pleistocene, and that segments of cave bear DNA still persist in the genomes of living brown bears.
- A revision of bear fossils from Zhoukoudian is published by Jiangzuo et al. (2018), who unambiguously confirm the presence of Ursus deningeri in Loc. 1 of Zhoukoudian.
- A study on the bone histology of cave bear femora, and on its implications for inferring growth and life history variables of cave bears, is published by Veitschegger et al. (2018).
- A study on the morphometric variability of the mandibles of cave and brown bears and their ancestors (Ursus minimus and Ursus etruscus) is published by Baryshnikov, Puzachenko & Baryshnikova (2018).
- A study on the dynamics of lineage diversification and diversity of body mass and length in the evolution of musteloid carnivorans based on data from extant and fossil taxa is published by Law, Slater & Mehta (2018).
- A study estimating the body mass of the fossil procyonids Cyonasua, Parahyaenodon and Tetraprothomo is published by Tarquini et al. (2018).
- Fossils of members of the genera Nasua and Procyon are described from the Marplatan stage of the El Breal of Orocual locality (Venezuela) by Ruiz-Ramoni, Rincón & Montellano-Ballesteros (2018), representing the oldest record of these procyonids in South America reported so far.
- The first well-preserved skull of the fossil mustelid Leptarctus oregonensis is described from the Miocene Mascall Formation (Oregon, United States) by Calede, Kehl & Davis (2018).
- A study on joints morphology and mobility in the hind limb of the Miocene mustelid species Semantor macrurus is published by Lavrov, Tarasenko & Vlasenko (2018).
- Description of new fossil material of Iberictis azanzae and I. buloti from the early Miocene of Spain, providing new information on the anatomy of Iberictis, and a study on the phylogenetic relationships of this genus is published online by Valenciano et al. (2018).
- Femur of a member of the genus Enhydra (a relative of the sea otter) is described from the middle Pleistocene Merced Formation (California, United States) by Boessenecker (2018), representing the oldest record of Enhydra in the Pacific with robust geochronologic age control reported so far.
- New specimens of members of the genus Enaliarctos are described from the Miocene Skooner Gulch Formation (California, United States), Oligocene Yaquina Formation (Oregon, United States) and Miocene Astoria Formation (Oregon, United States) by Poust & Boessenecker (2018), extending the geographic and temporal range of the genus.
- A study on the morphology of the forelimbs of Enaliarctos mealsi and extant phocine earless seals, on the use of forelimbs to secure and tear prey by extant phocine seals, and on its implications for inferring the feeding behaviour of early pinnipeds, is published by Hocking et al. (2018).
- Description of the anatomy of the first known mandible of the earless seal Devinophoca claytoni from the Miocene of Slovakia is published by Rahmat & Koretsky (2018).
- A humerus of an earless seal belonging to the subfamily Monachinae is described from the Pliocene (most likely Piacenzian) Lillo Formation (Belgium) by Dewaele, Lambert & Louwye (2018), representing the first known monachine specimen from the latest early to late Pliocene of the North Sea.
- A fossil specimen assigned to the genus Homiphoca is described from the Pliocene of Spain by Rahmat et al. (2018), representing the first European record of this genus.
- A study on the mandibular morphology of the odobenid Neotherium mirum, as well as on the affinities of mandibles from the Miocene Sharktooth Hill Bonebed in California representing other pinnipeds, is published by Velez-Juarbe (2018).
- New specimen of Ontocetus emmonsi is described from the Austin Sand Pit (Ridgeville, South Carolina, United States) by Boessenecker, Boessenecker & Geisler (2018), representing the youngest record of O. emmonsi from the Atlantic coastal plain reported so far.
- Evidence of Pleistocene hyenas preying upon small rodents is reported from the Bois Roche cave site (France) by Williams et al. (2018).
- A study on the external brain morphology of a juvenile cave hyena from the Jasovská Cave (Slovakia) is published by Petrovič et al. (2018).
- Cougar skull is described from the Pleistocene (Ensenadan) of Argentina by Chimento & Dondas (2018), representing the first unequivocal record of the cougar prior to late Pleistocene times in South America.
- A study on the shape and the dimensions of the bony vestibular system in the inner ear of the cheetah, comparing it with the vestibular system in other extant felids and in the extinct giant cheetah (Acinonyx pardinensis) and Proailurus lemanensis, and on the evolution of the vestibular system of the cheetah is published by Grohé, Lee & Flynn (2018).
- Description of a partial skull of a large felid from the late Villafranchian site of Monte Argentario (Italy), formerly assigned to the species Panthera gombaszoegensis, is published by Cherin et al. (2018), who refer this specimen (and some other Italian materials previously referred to P. gombaszoegensis) to the species Acinonyx pardinensis.
- Description of fossils of at least four adult cave lions (Panthera spelaea) from Medvedia Cave in the Západné Tatra Mountains (Slovakia) and a study on the range and social behavior of members of this taxon is published by Sabol, Gullár & Horvát (2018).
- A study on bones belonging to at least 11 individuals of fossil lion from the Imanai Cave in the Southern Urals, representing one of the largest Eurasian burial sites of fossil lions, is published by Gimranov et al. (2018).
- An exceptionally large skull of a lion, comparable to large specimens of the American lion in terms of skull length and substantially larger than known skulls of extant lions, is described from the Pleistocene of Kenya by Manthi et al. (2018).
- A study on the historical biogeography of the leopard (Panthera pardus), based on data from mitogenome sequences from historical samples spanning the entire modern leopard distribution, as well as from Late Pleistocene remains from Caucasus and Central Europe, is published by Paijmans et al. (2018).
- The northernmost fossil record of the jaguar from Argentina is reported from the late Pleistocene-early Holocene Río Bermejo Formation (Formosa Province) by Rodriguez et al. (2018).
- A study on the evolution of the morphological diversity of the mandibles of saber-toothed cats, as well as on the speciation and extinction rates in the evolution of saber-toothed cats, is published by Piras et al. (2018).
- A study on the evolution of upper canine length in the felid lineages leading to the fossil saber-toothed cats and extant clouded leopard is published by Harano & Kutsukake (2018).
- A canine of Megantereon whitei is reported from Trlica Cave in Montenegro by Vislobokova (2018), reflecting the first penetration of this African species into the Balkans.
- An almost complete skull of Smilodon fatalis will be described from the Pleistocene Sopas Formation (Uruguay) by Manzuetti et al. (2018), representing the first known record of the species from the eastern part of South America.
- A study on the skull stiffness and flexibility in Smilodon fatalis and Homotherium serum, and on their implications for inferring the killing behavior of these cats, is published by Figueirido et al. (2018).

Name	Novelty	Status	Authors	Age	Unit	Location	Notes	Images
Allodesmus demerei	Sp. nov	Valid	Boessenecker & Churchill	Miocene (Tortonian)	Montesano Formation	United States (Washington)		
Allodesmus uraiporensis	Sp. nov	Valid	Tonomori et al.	Middle Miocene	Okoppezawa Formation	Japan		
Auroraphoca	Gen. et sp. nov	Valid	Dewaele et al.	Pliocene (Zanclean)	Yorktown Formation	United States (North Carolina)	An earless seal belonging to the subfamily Monachinae. The type species is A. atlantica.	
Canis lupus cristaldii	Subsp. nov	Valid	Angelici & Rossi	Holocene		Italy	A wolf subspecies.	
Civettictis braini	Sp. nov	Valid	Fourvel	Pliocene-Pleistocene transition	Kromdraai fossil site	South Africa	A relative of the African civet.	
Enhydrictis praegalictoides	Sp. nov	Valid	Rook et al.	Pleistocene		Italy	A member of the family Mustelidae belonging to the subfamily Ictonychinae and to the tribe Galictini.	
Frisiphoca	Gen. et comb. nov	Valid	Dewaele, Lambert & Louwye	Late Miocene	Probably Diest Formation	Belgium	An earless seal belonging to the subfamily Phocinae. The type species is "Monotherium" aberratum Van Beneden (1876); genus also includes "Monotherium" affine Van Beneden (1876).	
Gulo sudorus	Sp. nov	Valid	Samuels, Bredehoeft & Wallace	Early Pliocene (earliest Blancan)	Gray Fossil Site	United States (Tennessee)	A relative of the wolverine.	
Katifelis	Gen. et sp. nov	Valid	Adrian, Werdelin & Grossman	Early Miocene	Lothidok Formation	Kenya	A member of the family Felidae. The type species is K. nightingalei.	
Kichechia savagei	Sp. nov	Valid	Adrian, Werdelin & Grossman	Early Miocene	Lothidok Formation	Kenya	A member of the family Viverridae belonging to the subfamily Paradoxurinae.	
Martellictis	Gen. et comb. nov	Valid	Bartolini Lucenti	Pleistocene		Austria; France; Italy; Netherlands; Slovakia	A member of the family Mustelidae. Genus includes "Mustela" ardea Gervais (1848–1852).	
Meles magnus	Sp. nov	Valid	Jiangzuo et al.	Early Pleistocene		China	A badger, a species of Meles.	
Nanodobenus	Gen. et sp. nov	Valid	Velez-Juarbe & Salinas-Márquez	Miocene	Tortugas Formation	Mexico	A relative of the walrus. The type species is N. arandai.	
Nasua mastodonta	Sp. nov	Valid	Emmert & Short	Blancan		United States (Florida)	A species of Nasua.	
Noriphoca	Gen. et comb. nov	Valid	Dewaele, Lambert & Louwye	Late Oligocene or early Miocene	Probably Bolognano Formation	Italy	An earless seal belonging to the subfamily Monachinae. The type species is "Monotherium" gaudini (Guiscardi, 1870).	
Pannonictis baroniensis	Sp. nov	Valid	Rook et al.	Pleistocene		Italy	A member of the family Mustelidae belonging to the subfamily Ictonychinae and to the tribe Galictini.	
Panthera balamoides	Sp. nov	Valid	Stinnesbeck et al.	Pleistocene		Mexico	A species of Panthera. Announced in 2018; the final version of the article naming it was published in 2020.	
Procyon gipsoni	Sp. nov	Valid	Emmert & Short	Blancan		United States (Florida)	A species of Procyon.	
Procyon megalokolos	Sp. nov	Valid	Emmert & Short	Blancan		United States (Florida)	A species of Procyon.	
Tchadailurus	Gen. et sp. nov	Valid	De Bonis et al.	Late Miocene		Chad	A member of the family Felidae belonging to the subfamily Machairodontinae. The type species is T. adei.	
Titanotaria	Gen. et sp. nov	Valid	Magallanes et al.	Late Miocene	Capistrano Formation	United States (California)	A relative of the walrus. The type species is T. orangensis.	
Virginiaphoca	Gen. et sp. nov	Valid	Dewaele et al.	Late Miocene or Pliocene (Zanclean)	Eastover Formation or Yorktown Formation	United States (Virginia)	An earless seal belonging to the subfamily Monachinae. The type species is V. magurai.	

=== Rodents ===
- A study on the late Miocene rodents of the Iberoccitanian Region (Iberian Peninsula and southern France), aiming to identify the rodent metacommunities and to analyse their reactions to environmental changes, is published by Blanco et al. (2018).
- A study on the ecology and dietary preferences of extinct endemic rodents from Hispaniola is published by Cooke & Crowley (2018).
- A study on the morphology of tarsal bones of two species of the ctenodactyloid genus Tamquammys from the Eocene of China, aiming at the reconstruction of locomotor adaptations and lifestyle of Tamquammys, is published by Fostowicz-Frelik, Li & Ni (2018).
- New adult and juvenile specimens of the dinomyid rodent Isostylomys laurillardi are described from the Miocene Camacho Formation (Uruguay) by Rinderknecht, Bostelmann & Ubilla (2018).
- A study on the anatomy and phylogenetic relationships of Tetrastylus walteri, based on data from the holotype and new specimens, is published online by Kerber et al. (2018), who consider this taxon to be a valid species.
- The first description of the postcranium of Cardiomys, based on a well-preserved specimen from the late Miocene of Central Argentina, and a study on the paleobiology and systematics of this taxon is published by Candela, Muñoz & García-Esponda (2018).
- A mandibular fragment of the euryzygomatomyine echimyid Dicolpomys fossor is described from the late Holocene Sambaquí de Puerto Landa site (Entre Ríos Province, Argentina) by Verzi et al. (2018), representing the most recent record of an extinct South American caviomorph genus reported so far.
- The first known fossil (an almost complete skull) of the San Felipe hutia (Mesocapromys sanfelipensis) is described from a cave room within Cueva del Indio (Mayabeque Province, Cuba) by Viñola Lopez, Garrido & Bermúdez (2018), who interpret their finding as indicating that the modern population of this species is a marginal relic of its former distribution during the Quaternary.
- A revision of the fossils of members of the genus Phoberomys from the late Miocene of Entre Ríos Province (Argentina) and a study on their systematics and phylogenetic relationships is published by Rasia & Candela (2018).
- Fossil New World porcupine belonging or related to the species Coendou magnus is described from the Upper Pleistocene of the Santa Fe Province (Argentina) by Vezzosi & Kerber (2018).
- Revision of the problematic Neogene sciurid genus Sinotamias is published by Sinitsa (2018).
- A sciurid rodent is reported from the Miocene Clarkia fossil beds (Latah Formation, Idaho, United States) by Calede et al. (2018), representing the first tetrapod reported from this lagerstätte.
- Fossils of Miopetaurista neogrivensis with an estimated age of 11.63 million years are described from the Abocador de Can Mata site ACM/C5-D1 (Els Hostalets de Pierola, Catalonia, Spain) by Casanovas-Vilar et al. (2018), representing the oldest fossils of a flying squirrel that display the gliding-related diagnostic features shared by extant forms.
- The first virtual endocasts of extant mountain beaver and three fossil members of the family Aplodontiidae are described by Bertrand et al. (2018).
- A study on the enamel ultrastructure of molars of the anomalomyid species Anomalomys gaillardi, as well as extant and fossil spalacids from Ukraine belonging to the genera Pliospalax and Spalax, is published by Nowakowski et al. (2018).
- Revision of putative fossils of members of the genus Nectomys from the Pleistocene of Argentina and Bolivia is published by Pardiñas & Barbière (2018).
- A study on the demographic history of Abrothrix manni during Pleistocene glaciations in southern Chile is published by Valdez & D'Elía (2018).
- A study on the body mass and evolution of the Miocene rodent Mikrotia from Italy is published by Moncunill-Solé, Jordana & Köhler (2018).
- A study on the phylogenetic relationships of murid rodents, implementing nine robust fossil constraints based on a thorough review of the fossil record, is published by Aghová et al. (2018).

Name	Novelty	Status	Authors	Age	Unit	Location	Notes	Images
Aepyocricetus	Gen. et sp. nov	Valid	Li et al.	Pliocene	Zanda Basin	China	A hamster. Genus includes new species A. liuae.	
Allosminthus gobiensis	Sp. nov	Valid	Li	Paleogene		China	A member of the family Dipodidae.	
Alormys	Gen. et sp. nov	Valid	Louys et al.	Holocene		Indonesia	A member of the family Muridae belonging to the subfamily Murinae. The type species is A. aplini.	
Bustrania	Gen. et sp. nov	Valid	De Bruijn et al.	Eocene		Serbia	A member of Muroidea belonging to the subfamily Pappocricetodontinae. The type species is B. dissimile.	
Cardiatherium calingastaense	Sp. nov	Valid	Cerdeño et al.	Late Miocene	Las Flores Formation	Argentina	A relative of the capybara. Announced in 2018; the final version of the article naming it was published in 2019.	
Cholamys	Gen. et sp. nov	Valid	Pérez et al.	Deseadan	Salla beds	Bolivia	A New World porcupine. Genus includes new species C. tetralophodonta.	
Douglassciurus oaxacaensis	Sp. nov	Valid	Ferrusquia-Villafranca et al.	Eocene	Yolomécatl Formation	Mexico	A sciurid rodent.	
Eoincamys parvus	Sp. nov	Valid	Boivin et al.	Early Oligocene	Pozo Formation	Peru	Possibly a member of Chinchilloidea.	
Eoincamys valverdei	Sp. nov	Valid	Boivin et al.	Early Oligocene	Pozo Formation	Peru	Possibly a member of Chinchilloidea.	
Eumyarion gordesensis	Sp. nov	Valid	Pelaez-Campomanes et al.	Early Miocene		Turkey	A member of the family Muridae.	
Euroxenomys nanus	Sp. nov	Valid	Mörs & Tomida	Early Miocene	Nakamura Formation	Japan	A member of the family Castoridae.	
Gregorymys veloxikua	Sp. nov	Valid	Jiménez-Hidalgo, Guerrero-Arenas & Smith	Eocene (Chadronian)		Mexico	A member of Geomyidae.	
Karydomys strati	Sp. nov	Valid	López-Antoñanzas et al.	Miocene	Keramia Formation	Greece	A species of Karydomys.	
Kichkasteiromys	Gen. et sp. nov	Valid	Boivin et al.	Early Oligocene	Pozo Formation	Peru	A member of Erethizontoidea. The type species is K. raimondii.	
Kraglievichimys	Gen. et comb. nov	Valid	Barbière, Ortiz & Pardiñas	Pliocene	Monte Hermoso Formation	Argentina	A sigmodontine rodent; a new genus for "Auliscomys" formosus Reig (1978).	
Lapazomys	Gen. et sp. nov	Valid	Pérez et al.	Deseadan	Salla beds	Bolivia	A caviomorph rodent related to the group Octodontoidea. Genus includes new species L. hartenbergeri.	
Leggadina irvini	Sp. nov	Valid	Cramb, Price & Hocknull	Age uncertain, likely Middle or Late Pleistocene		Australia	A species of Leggadina.	
Leggadina webbi	Sp. nov	Valid	Cramb, Price & Hocknull	Middle Pleistocene		Australia	A species of Leggadina.	
Mayomys	Gen. et sp. nov	Valid	Boivin et al.	Early Oligocene	Pozo Formation	Peru	A member of Octodontoidea of uncertain phylogenetic placement. The type species is M. confluens.	
Microparamys solis	Sp. nov	Valid	Dawson & Constenius	Middle Eocene	Kishenehn Formation	United States (Montana)		
Migraveramus lavocati	Sp. nov	Valid	Pérez et al.	Deseadan	Salla beds	Bolivia	A caviomorph rodent related to the group Octodontoidea.	
Mogilia	Gen. et 2 sp. nov	Valid	Wessels et al.	Eocene and early Oligocene		Serbia	A member of the family Muridae belonging to the subfamily Melissiodontinae. The type species is M. miloshi; genus also includes M. lautus.	
Namaparamys	Gen. et sp. nov	Valid	Mein & Pickford	Eocene (Ypresian/Lutetian)	Black Crow Limestone	Namibia	Possibly a relative of Reithroparamys. The type species is N. inexpectatus.	
Nannocricetus qiui	Sp. nov	Valid	Li et al.	Pliocene	Zanda Basin	China	A hamster.	
Neocavia pampeana	Sp. nov	Valid	Madozzo-Jaén et al.	Huayquerian	Cerro Azul Formation	Argentina	A member of Caviinae.	
Orcemys	Gen. et sp. nov	Valid	Martin et al.	Early Pleistocene		Spain	A member of Arvicolidae. Genus includes new species O. giberti.	
Paracricetodon gracilis	Sp. nov	Valid	Van de Weerd et al.	Early Oligocene		Serbia	A member of the family Muridae belonging to the subfamily Paracricetodontinae.	
Paracricetodon stojanovici	Sp. nov	Valid	Van de Weerd et al.	Late Eocene and early Oligocene		Serbia	A member of the family Muridae belonging to the subfamily Paracricetodontinae.	
Pararhizomys huaxiaensis	Sp. nov	Valid	Wang	Late Miocene	Linxia Basin	China	A member of the family Spalacidae belonging to the subfamily Tachyoryctoidinae and the tribe Pararhizomyini.	
Pararhizomys longensis	Sp. nov	Valid	Wang	Late Miocene	Linxia Basin	China	A member of the family Spalacidae belonging to the subfamily Tachyoryctoidinae and the tribe Pararhizomyini.	
Phenacomys europaeus	Sp. nov	Valid	Van Kolfschoten, Tesakov & Bell	Early Pleistocene (Gelasian)		Netherlands	A heather vole, the first known European member of the genus Phenacomys.	
Protosteiromys pattersoni	Sp. nov	Valid	Pérez et al.	Deseadan	Salla beds	Bolivia	A New World porcupine.	
Protozetamys	Gen. et sp. nov	Valid	Ferrusquia-Villafranca et al.	Late middle Eocene	Yolomécatl Formation	Mexico	A relative of Zetamys, assigned to the new family Zetamyidae; a possible member of Caviomorpha. Genus includes new species P. mixtecus.	
Pseudorhizomys	Gen. et 4 sp. nov	Valid	Wang	Late Miocene	Linxia Basin	China	A member of the family Spalacidae belonging to the subfamily Tachyoryctoidinae and the tribe Pararhizomyini. Genus includes new species P. indigenus, P. gansuensis, P. planus and P. pristinus.	
Sallamys woodi	Sp. nov	Valid	Pérez et al.	Deseadan	Salla beds	Bolivia	A caviomorph rodent related to the group Octodontoidea.	
Selvamys	Gen. et sp. nov	Valid	Boivin et al.	Early Oligocene	Pozo Formation	Peru	A member of Octodontoidea of uncertain phylogenetic placement. The type species is S. paulus.	
Shapajamys	Gen. et sp. nov	Valid	Boivin et al.	Early Oligocene	Pozo Formation	Peru	A member of Erethizontoidea. The type species is S. labocensis.	
Simplomys hugi	Sp. nov	Valid	Prieto et al.	Miocene		Switzerland	A dormouse.	
Tarapotomys	Gen. et 2 sp. nov	Valid	Boivin et al.	Early Oligocene	Pozo Formation	Peru	A member of Caviomorpha of uncertain phylogenetic placement. The type species is T. subandinus; genus also includes T. mayoensis.	
Tsaukhaebmys	Gen. et sp. nov	Valid	Pickford	Eocene (Ypresian/Lutetian)	Black Crow Limestone	Namibia	A member of the family Zegdoumyidae. The type species is T. calcareus.	
Tufamys	Gen. et sp. nov	Valid	Pickford	Eocene (Bartonian, possibly Priabonian)	Eocliff Limestone	Namibia	A member of Hystricognathi belonging to the new family Tufamyidae. The type species is T. woodi.	
Vasseuromys tectus	Sp. nov	Valid	Sinitsa & Nesin	Late Miocene		Ukraine	A dormouse belonging to the subfamily Leithiinae.	
Witenia europea	Sp. nov	Valid	De Bruijn et al.	Eocene		Serbia	A member of Muroidea belonging to the subfamily Pappocricetodontinae.	

=== Primates ===
- A study on the morphology of the nasolacrimal canal and duct in extant and Paleogene strepsirrhines and haplorhines, and on its implications for inferring the phylogenetic relationships of Paleogene primates, is published by Rossie et al. (2018).
- A study on the anatomy and phylogenetic relationships of Propotto leakeyi is published by Gunnell et al. (2018), who support George Simpson's original interpretation of this species as a strepsirrhine primate, and consider both P. leakeyi and Plesiopithecus teras to be relatives of the aye-aye.
- A study on reconstructing the jaw muscles and bite force of subfossil lemurs from Madagascar, as well as on their implications for inferring the diet of these lemurs, is published by Perry (2018).
- A study on the early evolution of North American adapids and omomyids, comparing reconstructed dietary niches of these primates and other animals from their guild to establish the nature of the competitive environment surrounding primate origins in North America, is published by Stroik & Schwartz (2018).
- Description of isolated phalanges from four early Eocene localities in Wyoming (United States), indicative of presence of grooming claws in five genera of early haplorhine primates (including Teilhardina), is published by Boyer et al. (2018).
- A study evaluating whether the locomotor behaviour of extant New World monkeys can be inferred from their talus morphology, and applying machine learning algorithms trained using both the biomechanical and morphometric data from the extant taxa to infer the possible locomotor behaviour of Miocene New World monkeys from Argentina, Chile, Peru, Colombia and Cuba, is published by Püschel et al. (2018).
- Partial mandible of Homunculus patagonicus from the early Miocene sediments in the Coyle river area (Santa Cruz Province, Argentina), providing new information on the morphology of the mandible and teeth of Homunculus, and two teeth of Mazzonicebus almendrae from Colhue-Huapi (Chubut Province, Argentina), providing the first evidence of the deciduous dentition of Mazzonicebus, are described by Novo, Tejedor & González Ruiz (2018).
- A study on the phylogenetic relationship of the Jamaican monkey (Xenothrix mcgregori), as indicated by ancient DNA data, is published by Woods et al. (2018).
- A tibia of a large-bodied arboreally adapted Old World monkey (a member or a relative of the genus Rhinocolobus) is described from the Australopithecus afarensis-bearing Upper Laetolil Beds (~3.7 Ma) of Laetoli (Tanzania) by Laird et al. (2018), who also study the implications of the specimen for inferring the paleoenvironment of the Upper Laetolil Beds.
- A skull of a large papionin monkey is described from the Lower Pleistocene site of Dafnero-3 (Greece) by Kostopoulos et al. (2018), who interpret the anatomy of this skull as indicating that the specimen could equally be ascribed to either the Eurasian genus Paradolichopithecus or to the East Asian Procynocephalus, and argue in favor of the synonymy of these genera.
- A study on the phylogenetic relationships of living and fossil African papionins is published by Pugh & Gilbert (2018).
- A study on the fossil members of the genus Papio from across Africa, focusing on their distinguishing features and distribution, is published by Gilbert et al. (2018).
- A study on the feeding ecology of Plio-Pleistocene members of the genera Papio and Theropithecus from the Shungura Formation (Ethiopia) is published by Martin et al. (2018).
- Three specimens of the Barbary macaque are described from the Pleistocene of the Netherlands by Reumer, Mol & Kahlke (2018).
- A study evaluating whether climatic and environmental changes were the main cause of extinction of Oreopithecus bambolii is published by DeMiguel & Rook (2018).
- A study on the body mass sexual dimorphism in Nacholapithecus kerioi is published by Kikuchi et al. (2018).
- Description of the anatomy of the forelimb long bones of the holotype specimen of Nacholapithecus kerioi is published by Takano et al. (2018).
- Fragment of the maxilla of a member of the genus Sivapithecus is described from the Miocene of the Tapar locality (Gujarat, India) by Bhandari et al. (2018), representing the first record of a hominoid from the Neogene of the Kutch Basin.
- A review of the paleontological, archeological, genetic and behavioral evidence of the impact of at least 70,000 years of human influence on orangutan distribution, abundance and ecology is published by Spehar et al. (2018).
- Description of tooth decay affecting the type specimen of Dryopithecus carinthiacus, and a study on its implications for inferring the diet of this specimen, is published by Fuss, Uhlig & Böhme (2018).
- A study on the phylogenetic relationships of Graecopithecus published by Benoit & Thackeray (2017), aiming to refute the hypothesis that Graecopithecus is a member of the hominin clade, is criticized by Fuss et al. (2018).
- A study evaluating whether machine learning methods can accurately classify extant apes based on dental data, and using this classification method to explore the affinities between dentitions of Miocene hominoid fossils and living apes, is published by Monson, Armitage & Hlusko (2018).
- A study on the utility of enamel thickness, enamel-dentine junction shape and crown development for determining the taxonomic affiliation of isolated teeth of hominins and pongines from the Asian Pleistocene is published by Smith et al. (2018).

==== General paleoanthropology ====
- Estimations of body mass in Pliocene and Pleistocene hominins based on lower limb bones dimensions are presented by Ruff et al. (2018).
- A study on the evolution of the brain size in hominins is published by Du et al. (2018).
- A study on the evolution of the mandible shape in hominins, based on an analysis of the mandibular shape variation in a large sample of plesiadapiforms and primates, is published by Raia et al. (2018).
- A study on the cervical kinematics in early fossil hominins, based on an analysis of uncinate processes in the vertebrae of fossil hominins, Homo sapiens and extant nonhuman primates, is published by Meyer et al. (2018).
- A study on the intra-specific variation of patterns of metatarsal robusticity (a measure reflecting habitual stresses in long bones, and in particular, loads experienced over an animal's lifetime) in modern humans and extant African apes, and its implications for inferring whether the Olduvai Hominid 8 foot was biomechanically similar to the feet of modern humans, is published by Patel et al. (2018).
- A study on the bony shape variables in the metatarsals of extant anthropoid primates and fossil hominins, and on their importance to the evolution of terrestrial bipedalism in hominins, is published by Fernández et al. (2018).
- Domínguez-Rodrigo & Baquedano (2018) evaluate the ability of successful machine learning methods to compare and distinguish various types of bone surface modifications (trampling marks, crocodile bite marks and cut marks made with stone tools) in archaeofaunal assemblages.
- Taphonomic study on the ca. 1.84 million year old bovid fossils (preserving evidence of meat eating by early hominins) from Olduvai Gorge (Tanzania), evaluating whether hominins had early access to fleshed carcasses through hunting or active scavenging, or late access to largely defleshed carcasses through passive scavenging, is published by Parkinson (2018).
- The study published by Gierliński et al. (2017), reporting putative tetrapod footprints with hominin-like characteristics from the late Miocene of Crete (Greece), is criticized by Meldrum & Sarmiento (2018).
- A study aiming to estimate body mass of Orrorin tugenensis and Ardipithecus ramidus is published by Grabowski, Hatala & Jungers (2018).
- A study comparing the calcar femorale of Orrorin tugenensis and other hominoids is published by Kuperavage et al. (2018), who interpret their findings as indicating that O. tugenensis was an early bipedal hominin.
- A study on the hydrological changes in the Limpopo River catchment and in sea surface temperature in the southwestern Indian Ocean for the past 2.14 million years, and on their implications for inferring the palaeoclimatic changes in southeastern Africa in this time period and their possible impact on the evolution of early hominins, is published by Caley et al. (2018).
- A study on the behavioral features which might have contributed to the demographic success of early hominids such as Australopithecus, based on comparison with macaques, is published by Meindl, Chaney & Lovejoy (2018).
- A study on the diversity dynamics of early hominins, evaluating whether the observed patterns of early hominin diversity can be better explained by sampling biases or genuine evolutionary processes, is published by Maxwell et al. (2018).
- A study on the pelvic morphology in Ardipithecus and Australopithecus, evaluating the hypothesis that early hominins retained ischial proportions and orientation that favored greater force production during climbing but limited their ability to hyperextend the hip and walk as economically as modern humans, is published by Kozma et al. (2018).
- Endocrania of two specimens of Australopithecus africanus from Sterkfontein Member 4 (South Africa) are virtually reconstructed by Beaudet et al. (2018).
- A study on the paleoenvironment and diet of Australopithecus africanus and Paranthropus robustus as indicated by tooth microwear is published by Peterson et al. (2018).
- A study on the relationship between root splay and overall morphology of first maxillary molars and jaw kinematics in South African Australopithecus africanus and Paranthropus robustus, and on its implications for inferring the dietary niches of these species, is published by Kupczik, Toro-Ibacache & Macho (2018).
- A study on the variation in trabecular bone structure of the femoral head in fossil hominins attributed to the species Australopithecus africanus, Paranthropus robustus and to the genus Homo, attempting to reconstruct hip joint loading conditions in these fossil hominins, is published by Ryan et al. (2018).
- A study on the habitats and diets of Paranthropus boisei and Homo rudolfensis from the Early Pleistocene of the Malawi Rift is published by Lüdecke et al. (2018).
- A study on the strontium isotope data derived from three studies of teeth of Paranthropus robustus, and on its implications for inferring habitat, mobility and growth of this species, is published by Sillen & Balter (2018).
- The skull of 'Mrs. Ples' (Sts 5 specimen of Australopithecus africanus) is interpreted as a skull of a small male rather than a large female individual by Tawane & Thackeray (2018).
- A study on the variation in the structure of trabecular bone and joint loading in the humeral head of extant hominoids, spider monkeys and Australopithecus africanus is published by Kivell et al. (2018), who interpret their findings as indicating that A. africanus may have still used its forelimbs for arboreal locomotion.
- Description of a nearly complete, 3.32-million-year-old foot of a juvenile Australopithecus afarensis from Dikika (Ethiopia) is published by DeSilva et al. (2018).
- A study on the possible date of the first appearance of Australopithecus sediba as indicated by the average hominin species' temporal range is published by Robinson et al. (2018).
- Studies on the anatomy of the skeleton of Australopithecus sediba are published by De Ruiter et al. (2018), Williams et al. (2018), Churchill et al. (2018), Kivell et al. (2018), Churchill et al. (2018), DeSilva et al. (2018) and Holliday et al. (2018).
- A digital animation of the proposed walking mechanics of Australopithecus sediba is presented by Zhang & DeSilva (2018).
- A study on the linear marks observed on the hominin fossil Stw53 from the Sterkfontein cave site (South Africa), evaluating whether these marks were cutmarks inflicted by stone tools or non-anthropic modifications, is published by Hanon, Péan & Prat (2018).
- New artifacts are described from the Swartkrans cave (South Africa) by Kuman et al. (2018), who confirm the affinity of the Swartkrans artifacts with the Oldowan industrial complex.
- Oldowan stone tools and associated hominin-modified fossil bones are reported from strata estimated to ≈2.4 and ≈1.9 Ma from two deposits at Ain Boucherit (Algeria) by Sahnouni et al. (2018).
- Pelvic remains of Homo naledi from the Dinaledi Chamber in the Rising Star Cave system (Cradle of Humankind, South Africa) are described by VanSickle et al. (2018).
- A study on the minimum number of individuals and on a demographic profile of the assemblage of Homo naledi individuals in the Dinaledi Chamber (Rising Star Cave system, South Africa) is published by Bolter et al. (2018).
- A study on the diet of Homo naledi as indicated by teeth wear textures is published by Ungar & Berger (2018).
- A study comparing tooth shape and size in Homo naledi and other South African Plio-Pleistocene hominins, as well as a study on the possible diet of Homo naledi, is published by Berthaume, Delezene & Kupczik (2018).
- A study on the endocast morphology of Homo naledi, comparing it with other hominoids and fossil hominins, is published by Holloway et al. (2018).
- A study on the phenetic affinities and taxonomic validity of Homo naledi as indicated by teeth morphology will be published by Irish et al. (2018).
- Three incudes of Homo naledi recovered from the Dinaledi Chamber in the Rising Star cave system are described by Elliott et al. (2018).
- Partial mandible of Homo naledi which was most likely affected by peripheral osteoma is reported by Odes et al. (2018).
- A study on evaluating whether deliberate disposal of corpses is the only likely explanation for large assemblages of fossil human bones from the Middle Pleistocene sites of Sima de los Huesos (Spain) and the Dinaledi Chamber (South Africa) is published by Egeland et al. (2018).
- A study on the phylogenetic relationships of the Pleistocene hominin specimen (a fragmented skullcap) from Kocabaş (Denizli Basin, Turkey) is published by Vialet et al. (2018).
- A study on the morphology and affinities of the hominin calvaria KNM-ER 42700 from Ileret, Kenya is published by Neubauer et al. (2018).
- A study on the frequency and location of hominin (likely Homo habilis) butchery marks and carnivore tooth marks on mammal bones from the HWK EE site (Olduvai Gorge, Tanzania), and on their implications for inferring carnivorous feeding behavior of the HWK EE hominins and the ecological interactions they had with carnivores, is published by Pante et al. (2018).
- A study estimating possible adult stature and body mass of the Homo erectus specimen KNM-WT 15000 ("Turkana Boy") is published by Cunningham et al. (2018).
- A study on the structure of the animal community known from the Okote Member of the Koobi Fora Formation at East Turkana (Kenya) as indicated by tracks and skeletal assemblages, and on the interactions of Homo erectus with environment and associated faunas from this site, is published by Roach et al. (2018).
- A study on the large cutting tools from four Acheulean sites at Koobi Fora dated to ~1.4 million years ago, investigating the behavioural patterns underpinning recorded artefact variability, is published by Presnyakova et al. (2018).
- A study on 1.07–0.99 million-year-old pelvic remains from Buia (Eritrea) is published by Hammond et al. (2018), who interpret their findings as indicating that the postcranial morphology of Homo erectus sensu lato was variable and, in some cases, nearly indistinguishable from modern human morphology, and that the shared last common ancestor of Late Pleistocene Homo species was unlikely to have an australopith-like pelvis.
- A study on the humeral rigidity and strength in members of the species Homo erectus known from Zhoukoudian (China), comparing it with the humeral rigidity and strength in the African members of the species, is published by Xing et al. (2018).
- A study on the morphology of teeth of Homo erectus from Zhoukoudian is published by Xing, Martinón-Torres & Bermúdez de Castro (2018).
- A study on the age of the archaeological layers from the Zhoukoudian Upper Cave, and on its implications for understanding Late Quaternary human evolution in eastern Asia, is published by Li et al. (2018).
- New magnetostratigraphic dating results for the Bailong Cave (China) sedimentary sequence containing hominin teeth assigned to the species Homo erectus are presented by Kong et al. (2018).
- An Early Pleistocene artefact sequence, containing 17 artefact layers that extend from approximately 1.26 million years ago to about 2.12 million years ago, is described from the Shangchen locality (Loess Plateau, China) by Zhu et al. (2018), indicating that hominins left Africa earlier than indicated by the evidence from Dmanisi.
- A study investigating how the hominin groups living in the Qinling Mountains range (China) responded to glacial–interglacial shifts from ~1.20 million years ago to ~0.05 million years ago is published by Sun et al. (2018).
- A study on the morphology and affinities of the Middle Pleistocene hominin mandible recovered from La Niche cave site of the Montmaurin karst system (France) is published by Vialet et al. (2018).
- Taphonomic signatures of the Aroeira 3 cranium, with a specific focus on cranial breakage, are described by Sanz et al. (2018), who attempt to approximate the cause of death of this individual.
- A study on strategies for thermoregulation in the absence of fire in conditions experienced by hominins in north-west Europe before 400,000 years ago is published by MacDonald (2018).
- Evidence for progressive aridification in East Africa since about 575,000 years before present, based on data from sediments from Lake Magadi (Kenya), is presented by Owen et al. (2018), who also evaluate the influence of the increasing Middle- to Late-Pleistocene aridification and environmental variability on the physical and cultural evolution of Homo sapiens in East Africa.
- A series of excavated Middle Stone Age sites from the Olorgesailie Basin (Kenya), dated as ≈320,000 years old, is presented by Brooks et al. (2018), who report evidence of hominins preparing cores and points, exploiting iron-rich rocks to obtain red pigment, and procuring stone tool materials from ≥25–50 km distance.
- A study on the environmental dynamics before and after the onset of the early Middle Stone Age in the Olorgesailie Basin (Kenya) is published by Potts et al. (2018).
- A study on the chronology of the Acheulean and early Middle Stone Age sedimentary deposits in the Olorgesailie Basin (Kenya) is published by Deino et al. (2018).
- A study on bone artefacts from Middle Stone Age layers at Sibudu Cave (South Africa), evaluating what kinds of animals were used to make bone tools, is published by Bradfield (2018).
- A study on the stone tools from the Acheulean site of Saffaqah near Dawadmi (Saudi Arabia), and their implications for inferring how hominins adapted to this region, is published by Shipton et al. (2018).
- A study on the stratigraphy, archaeology and chronology of the Saffaqah site, providing the first secure dates for this site, is published by Scerri et al. (2018).
- A study on the age of stone tools from the Attirampakkam site in India is published by Akhilesh et al. (2018), indicating the emergence of a Middle Paleolithic culture in India at 385 ± 64 thousand years ago.
- Stone tools associated with a skeleton of Rhinoceros philippinensis showing clear signs of butchery are described from a bone bed at Kalinga in the Cagayan Valley of northern Luzon (the Philippines), dated to between 777 and 631 thousand years ago, by Ingicco et al. (2018).
- The study on the Cerutti Mastodon site published by Holen et al. (2017), reporting possible evidence of an unidentified species of the genus Homo living in California 130,000 years ago, is criticized by Ferraro et al. (2018).
- Bone retouchers dated as approximately 125–105,000 years old are described from the Lingjing site in Henan, China by Doyon et al. (2018), representing the first evidence from Eastern Asia for the use of bone as raw material to modify stone tools.
- A 90,000-years-old specialized bone tool discovered in association with the Aterian techno-complex is described from the cave site of Dar es-Soltan 1 (Morocco) by Bouzouggar et al. (2018).
- A study on the antiquity of the remains of Homo antecessor, based on the first direct Electron Spin Resonance dating of a tooth from the TD6 unit of Atapuerca Gran Dolina site (Spain), is published by Duval et al. (2018).
- A study aiming to test the hypothesis if Homo antecessor molars approximated the Neanderthal rather than the Homo sapiens condition for tissue proportions and enamel thickness is published by Martín-Francés et al. (2018).
- An assemblage of hominin tracks produced by adults and children potentially as young as 12 months, probably members of the species Homo heidelbergensis living 700,000 years ago, is described from the Upper Awash Valley (Ethiopia) by Altamura et al. (2018).
- A study on the morphology and function of the browridge of the Kabwe 1 archaic hominin specimen is published by Godinho, Spikins & O'Higgins (2018).
- A study intending to detect introgressed Denisovan genetic material in present-day human genomes is published by Browning et al. (2018), who report evidence of Denisovan ancestry in populations from East and South Asia and Papuans, and interpret their findings as indicating that at least two distinct instances of Denisovan admixture into modern humans occurred.
- Genome recovered from a bone fragment from the Denisova Cave (Russia) is presented by Slon et al. (2018), who interpret the studied individual as the offspring of a Neanderthal mother and a Denisovan father.
- A study on the absolute bone volume in five human long bones from the Sima de los Huesos site is published by Carretero et al. (2018), who interpret their findings as indicating that Sima de los Huesos hominins had on average heavier long bones than extant humans of the same size.
- A study on the stone tools from the site of la Noira (France) and their implications for reconstructing early Acheulean hominin behavior is published by Hardy et al. (2018), who argue that the hominins from this site used a broad range of resources including wood, plants, mammals, and possibly birds and fish, and that Middle Pleistocene hominins had detailed local environmental knowledge and were able to adapt to a wide range of environments.
- A study aiming to estimate total lung capacity of Neanderthals, as well as Early Pleistocene hominins from the Gran Dolina site ATD6 (Spain), is published by García-Martínez et al. (2018).
- A series of partially charred wooden tools is described from the late Middle Pleistocene site of Poggetti Vecchi (central Italy) by Aranguren et al. (2018), who interpret their findings as indicating that Neanderthals were able to choose the appropriate timber and to process it with fire to produce tools.
- A wooden tool (possibly a digging stick), likely produced by Neanderthals, is described from the early Late Pleistocene Aranbaltza III site (Basque Country, Spain) by Rios-Garaizar et al. (2018), representing the oldest wooden tool from southern Europe reported so far.
- Cave art in Cave of La Pasiega, Maltravieso cave and Ardales cave (Spain) is dated as older than 64,000 years (thus predating the arrival of modern humans in Europe) by Hoffmann et al. (2018), who interpret their findings as indicative of Neandertal authorship of the art; the study is subsequently criticized by Pearce & Bonneau (2018), Aubert, Brumm & Huntley (2018), Slimak et al. (2018) and White et al. (2020).
- A study on the age of the flowstone capping the Cueva de los Aviones deposit in southeast Spain is published by Hoffmann et al. (2018), who report that Neanderthal-associated evidence of symbolic behavior found at the site is 115,000 to 120,000 years old and predates the earliest known comparable evidence associated with modern humans by 20,000 to 40,000 years.
- Genomes of five Neanderthals from Belgium (Spy Cave and Goyet Caves), France (Les Cottés cave), Croatia (Vindija Cave) and Russia (Mezmaiskaya cave), who lived around 39,000 to 47,000 years ago, are sequenced by Hajdinjak et al. (2018).
- A study on Neanderthal skeletal remains and animal fossils from the Vindija Cave, and on their implications for inferring Neanderthal behaviour, is published by Patou-Mathis, Karavanić & Smith (2018).
- A study evaluating three hypotheses forwarded to explain the distinctive Neanderthal face is published by Wroe et al. (2018).
- A study evaluating ecological niche similarity between the datasets of morphologically diagnostic Neanderthal remains and of archaeological sites with Middle Paleolithic artifacts (but no diagnostic hominin remains), as well as assessing its implications for inferring whether those archaeological sites represent Neanderthal occurrences, is published by Bible & Peterson (2018).
- Gaudzinski-Windheuser et al. (2018) report perforations observed on two fallow deer skeletons from the 120,000-year-old lake shore deposits from Neumark-Nord (Germany), interpreted as evidence of close-range use of thrusting spears by Neanderthals.
- A study on the timing and duration of periods of climate deterioration in the interior of the Iberian Peninsula in the late Pleistocene, evaluating the impact of climate on the abandonment of inner Iberian territories by Neanderthals 42,000 years ago, is published by Wolf et al. (2018).
- A study on pollen recovered from hyaena coprolites from Vanguard Cave (Gibraltar), and on its implications for reconstructing the vegetation landscapes in the environment inhabited by southern Iberian Neanderthals during the MIS 3, is published by Carrión et al. (2018).
- Evidence of bird and carnivore exploitation by Neanderthals (cut-marks in golden eagle, raven, wolf and lynx remains) is reported from the Axlor site (Spain) by Gómez-Olivencia et al. (2018).
- The first direct artefactual evidence for regular, systematic fire production by Neanderthals is reported from archaeological layers attributed to late Mousterian industries at multiple sites throughout France by Sorensen, Claud & Soressi (2018).
- A study on Neanderthal manual activities is published by Karakostis et al. (2018), who report evidence of habitual performance of precision grasping by Neanderthals.
- 3D virtual reconstruction of the thorax of the Kebara 2 Neanderthal individual is presented by Gómez-Olivencia et al. (2018).
- A study aiming to determine whether metabolic differences between competing populations of Neanderthals and anatomically modern humans alone could have accounted for Neanderthal extinction, as well as investigating Neanderthal fire use, is published by Goldfield, Booton & Marston (2018).
- A study on the climate changes in Europe during the Middle–Upper Paleolithic transition (based on speleothem records from the Ascunsă Cave and from the Tăușoare Cave, Romania), and on their implications for the replacement of Neanderthals by modern humans in Europe, is published by Fernández et al. (2018).
- A study on the cultural attribution and stratigraphic integrity of the Neanderthal skeletal material from La Roche-à-Pierrot, Saint-Césaire (France), evaluating whether there is reliable evidence for a Neanderthal-Châtelperronian association at this site, is published by Gravina et al. (2018).
- A study aiming to reconstruct 3D brain shape of Neanderthals and early Homo sapiens is published by Kochiyama et al. (2018).
- A study on patterns of seasonal variation in the environment inhabited by Neanderthals, on Neanderthal life history and on their exposure to potential environmental hazards, as indicated by data from oxygen isotopes, trace element distributions and tooth development in two Neanderthals and one modern human from Payre (an archeological site in the Rhone Valley, France), is published by Smith et al. (2018).
- A study on the human teeth from the Middle Pleistocene sites of Fontana Ranuccio and Visogliano (Italy), aiming to identify the presence, if any, of a Neanderthal-like signature in the inner structure of these teeth, is published by Zanolli et al. (2018).
- Evidence indicating that interbreeding between Neanderthals and modern humans led to the exposure of each species to novel viruses and to the exchange of adaptive alleles that provided resistance against these viruses is presented by Enard & Petrov (2018).
- A study on Neanderthals and early Upper Paleolithic anatomically modern humans, reassessing the hypothesis of higher skull trauma prevalence among Neanderthals than among anatomically modern humans, is published by Beier et al. (2018).
- A study on the age of the Buran-Kaya III site in Crimea is published by Prat et al. (2018), who interpret their findings as casting doubt on the survival of Neanderthal refuge zones in Crimea 28,000 years before present, and indicating that the human remains from this site represent some of the oldest evidence of anatomically modern humans in Europe.
- A study on the use of plants by early modern humans during the Middle Stone Age as indicated by analyses of phytoliths from the Pinnacle Point locality (South Africa) is published by Esteban et al. (2018).
- A study on the climatic changes in the Lake Tana area in the last 150,000 years and their implications for early modern human dispersal out of Africa is published by Lamb et al. (2018).
- A review of fossil, archaeological, genetic, and paleoenvironmental data on the origin of Homo sapiens is published by Scerri et al. (2018), who argue that Homo sapiens evolved within a set of interlinked groups living across Africa, whose connectivity changed through time, rather than from a single region/population in Africa.
- A review of the archaeological and palaeoenvironmental datasets relating to the Middle–Late Pleistocene dispersal of Homo sapiens within and beyond Africa is published by Roberts & Stewart (2018), who argue that H. sapiens developed a new ecological niche.
- A study on the evolution of modern human brain shape based on endocasts of Homo sapiens fossils from different geologic time periods is published by Neubauer, Hublin & Gunz (2018).
- Late Pleistocene hominin tracks, probably produced by Homo sapiens, are described from the Waenhuiskrans Formation (South Africa) by Helm et al. (2018).
- A study on the proxy evidence for environmental changes during past 116,000 years in lake sediment cores from the Chew Bahir basin, south Ethiopia (close to the key hominin site of Omo Kibish), and on its implications for inferring the environmental context for dispersal of anatomically modern humans from northeastern Africa, is published by Viehberg et al. (2018).
- A study on the age of a modern human mandible with teeth from the Misliya cave (Mount Carmel, Israel) is published by Hershkovitz et al. (2018), who date the fossil as at least 177,000 years old, representing the oldest reported fossil of a member of the Homo sapiens clade found outside Africa.
- A phalanx of a member of the species Homo sapiens is described from the ≈95–86,000 years old Al Wusta site (An Nafud, Saudi Arabia) by Groucutt et al. (2018), representing the oldest directly dated fossil of Homo sapiens found outside Africa and the Levant.
- A study on the effects of the Toba supereruption in East Africa is published by Yost et al. (2018), who find no evidence of the eruption causing a volcanic winter in East Africa or a population bottleneck among African populations of anatomically modern humans.
- Microscopic glass shards characteristic of the Youngest Toba Tuff (ashfall from the Toba eruption), dated as approximately 74,000 years old, are described from two archaeological sites on the south coast of South Africa by Smith et al. (2018), who interpret their findings as indicating that humans in this region thrived through the Toba event and the ensuing full glacial conditions.
- Evidence of human activity dating back to 78,000 years ago is reported from the Panga ya Saidi cave (Kenya) by Shipton et al. (2018), who describe a rich technological sequence that includes lithic forms elsewhere associated with the Middle Stone Age and the Later Stone Age.
- A cross-hatched pattern drawn with an ochre crayon is reported from approximately 73,000-year-old Middle Stone Age levels at Blombos Cave (South Africa) by Henshilwood et al. (2018), pre-dating previously known abstract and figurative drawings by at least 30,000 years.
- A study on the age of the cave art from the Kapova Cave (Russia) is published by Dublyansky et al. (2018).
- New rock art site, linkable chronoculturally to the Early Upper Paleolithic, is identified in Las Ventanas Cave (Spain) by Cortés-Sánchez et al. (2018).
- Rock art, including a figurative painting of an animal dating to at least 40,000 years ago, is described from the Lubang Jeriji Saléh cave (East Kalimantan, Indonesia) by Aubert et al. (2018).
- A study on changes in ochre use throughout an entire Upper Paleolithic sequence at Hohle Fels cave (Germany) is published by Velliky, Porr & Conard (2018).
- A study on the timing and mechanisms of the initial colonization of the Nwya Devu Paleolithic site (Tibetan Plateau) by humans is published by Zhang et al. (2018).
- A study on the human use of rainforest plant resources of prehistoric Sri Lanka, as indicated by data from phytoliths from the Fahien Rock Shelter sediments, is published by Premathilake & Hunt (2018).
- A reassessment of the Late Pleistocene human occupation site at Leang Burung 2 (Sulawesi, Indonesia), presenting new stratigraphic information and dating evidence from the site, is published by Brumm et al. (2018).
- A study on the timing of arrival of anatomically modern humans to Southeast Asia and Sahul is published by O'Connell et al. (2018), who consider it unlikely that the artifacts from Madjedbebe (northern Australia) reported by Clarkson et al. (2017) are more than 50,000 years old.
- A study investigating the most likely route used by early modern humans to colonize Sahul is published by Kealy, Louys & O'Connor (2018).
- A study on the results of re-excavation of Karnatukul (Serpent's Glen rockshelter in the Australian Little Sandy Desert), as well as on the chronology of this site, is published by McDonald et al. (2018).
- Genomic data from seven 15,000-year-old modern humans from Morocco, attributed to the Iberomaurusian culture, is presented by van de Loosdrecht et al. (2018), who report evidence of a genetic affinity of the studied individuals with early Holocene Near Easterners.
- A study on charred food remains from Shubayqa 1, a Natufian hunter-gatherer site located in northeastern Jordan and dated to 14.6–11.6 ka cal BP, is published by Arranz-Otaegui et al. (2018), who interpret their findings as providing the earliest empirical evidence for the preparation of bread-like products by Natufian hunter-gatherers, predating the emergence of agriculture by at least 4,000 years.
- A study on the timing of first human arrival in Madagascar, as indicated by evidence of prehistoric human modification of multiple elephant bird postcranial elements, is published by Hansford et al. (2018).
- A study on the timing of human colonization of Madagascar, as indicated by data from butchery marks on megafaunal bones, radiocarbon chronology of bone deposits and an analysis of the sedimentary record, is published by Anderson et al. (2018).
- Description of the morphology of three partial human mandibles from the Niah Caves (Sarawak, Malaysia) and a study on the age of these bones is published by Curnoe et al. (2018).
- A study investigating whether the human population occupying Beringia during the Last Glacial Maximum represented an example of human adaptation to an extreme environment, focusing on gene variations which might have conferred advantage in transmitting nutrients from mother to infant through breast milk under conditions of extremely low UV, is published by Hlusko et al. (2018).
- A review of the genetic, archeological and paleoecological data on the course of the settlement of the Americas is published by Potter et al. (2018), who argue that available evidence is consistent with an inland migration through an ice-free corridor or with a migration through Pacific coastal routes (or both), but neither can be rejected.
- A study on the timing of the latest Pleistocene glaciation in southeastern Alaska and its implication for inferring the route and timing of early human migration to the Americas is published by Lesnek et al. (2018).
- A study on the technological traits of fluted projectile points from northern Alaska and Yukon, in combination with artifacts from further south in Canada, the Great Plains, and eastern United States, evaluating the plausibility of historical relatedness and evolutionary patterns in the spread of fluted-point technology in North America in the latest Pleistocene and earliest Holocene, is published by Smith & Goebel (2018).
- Late Pleistocene human footprints left by a minimum of three people are described from the Calvert Island (British Columbia, Canada) by McLaren et al. (2018).
- Associated human and ground sloth tracks are described from the Rancholabrean deposits in the White Sands National Park (New Mexico, United States) by Bustos et al. (2018), who interpret their finding as evidence of humans actively stalking, harassing and likely hunting ground sloths in the late Pleistocene.
- A study on the age of a series of sedimentary samples from the earliest cultural assemblage at the Gault Site (Texas, United States), including a previously unknown, early projectile point technology unrelated to Clovis, is published by Williams et al. (2018).
- A robust lithic projectile point assemblage is reported from the layers dated between ≈13.5 and 15.5 ka ago at the Debra L. Friedkin site (Texas, United States) by Waters et al. (2018).
- A study on the age of the Anzick burial site (Montana, United States) is published by Becerra-Valdivia et al. (2018).
- The genome of two infants from the Upward Sun River site dated 11,500 years ago is sequenced, leading to the discovery of the Ancient Beringian ethnic group.
- Scheib et al. (2018) sequence 91 ancient human genomes from California and southwestern Ontario, demonstrating the existence of two distinct ancestries in North America, and finding contribution from both of these ancestral populations in all modern Central and South Americans.
- Posth et al. (2018) report genome-wide ancient DNA from 49 individuals from Central and South America, all dating to at least ~9,000 years ago, and interpret their finding as indicative of two previously undocumented genetic exchanges between North and South America.
- A study on the history of dispersal and diversification of people within the Americas, based on data from ancient human genomes spanning Alaska to Patagonia, is published by Moreno-Mayar et al. (2018).
- A study on the site context, geoarchaeology and material assemblages of the Valiente lithic workshop site (Chile) is published by Méndez et al. (2018).
- Evidence of plant domestication and food production from the early and middle Holocene site of Teotonio (southwestern Amazonia, Brazil) is presented by Watling et al. (2018).
- A study on the morphological affinity of the late Paleolithic human skull from the Zlatý kůň site in the Bohemian Karst (Czech Republic) is published by Rmoutilová et al. (2018), who also evaluate whether it is possible to determine the sex of the Zlatý kůň individual based on its skull morphology.
- A study on the Mesolithic site of Star Carr, indicating that there was intensive human activity at the site for several hundred years when the community was subject to multiple, severe, abrupt climate events that impacted air temperatures, the landscape and the ecosystem of the region, is published by Blockley et al. (2018).
- A study on the tools preserved with Ötzi, evaluating their implications for inferring Ötzi's individual history, the reconstruction of his last days and his cultural and social background, is published by Wierer et al. (2018).
- A study on the contents of Ötzi's stomach is published by Maixner et al. (2018).
- A study on the compositions of the faunal and stone artifact assemblages at Liang Bua (Flores, Indonesia), aiming to determine the last appearance dates of Stegodon, giant marabou stork, Old World vulture belonging to the genus Trigonoceps, and Komodo dragon at the Liang Bua site, and to determine what raw materials were preferred by hominins from this site ~50,000–13,000 years ago and whether these preferences were similar to those seen in the stone artifact assemblages attributed to Homo floresiensis or to those attributed to modern humans, is published by Sutikna et al. (2018).
- A study on genetic variation among a population of Rampasasa pygmies living close to the cave where remains of Homo floresiensis were discovered is published by Tucci et al. (2018), who find evidence of admixture with Denisovans and Neanderthals but no evidence for gene flow with other archaic hominins, and interpret their findings as indicating that at least two independent instances of hominin insular dwarfism occurred on Flores.
- A synthesis of patterns and incidences of developmental abnormalities and anomalies in the Pleistocene Homo fossil record is published by Trinkaus (2018).

==== New taxa ====
Name	Novelty	Status	Authors	Age	Unit	Location	Notes	Images
Asiadapis tapiensis	Sp. nov	Valid	Rose et al.	Eocene (early Ypresian)	Cambay Shale Formation	India		
Arcius hookeri	Sp nov	Valid	López-Torres & Silcox	Early Eocene	Blackheath Beds	UK	A paromomyid	
Arcius ilerdensis	Sp nov	Valid	López-Torres & Silcox	Early Eocene	Masia de l’Hereuet	Spain	A paromomyid	
Brontomomys	Gen. et sp. nov	Valid	Atwater & Kirk	Eocene (Uintan)	Friars Formation	United States (California)	A member of the family Omomyidae. Genus includes new species B. cerutti.	
Ekwiiyemakius	Gen. et sp. nov	Valid	Atwater & Kirk	Eocene (Uintan)	Friars Formation	United States (California)	A member of the family Omomyidae. Genus includes new species E. walshi.	
Europolemur midiensis	Sp. nov	Valid	Godinot in Godinot et al.	Eocene		France		
Gunnelltarsius	Gen. et sp. nov	Valid	Atwater & Kirk	Eocene (Uintan)	Friars Formation	United States (California)	A member of the family Omomyidae. Genus includes new species G. randalli.	
Junzi	Gen. et sp. nov	Valid	Turvey et al.	Holocene		China	A gibbon. Genus includes new species J. imperialis.	
Namadapis	Gen. et sp. nov	Valid	Godinot, Senut & Pickford	Middle Eocene		Namibia	A member of the family Adapidae belonging to the subfamily Caenopithecinae. The type species is N. interdictus.	
Rouzilemur	Gen. et sp. nov	Valid	Godinot in Godinot et al.	Eocene		France	A member of the family Notharctidae. Genus includes new species R. pulcher.	
Simiolus minutus	Sp. nov	Valid	Rossie & Hill	Middle Miocene	Ngorora Formation	Kenya		
Walshina	Gen. et sp. et comb. nov	Valid	López-Torres, Silcox & Holroyd	Eocene (Uintan and Duchesnean)	Sespe Formation	United States (California; Wyoming)	A member of the family Omomyidae. The type species is W. esmaraldensis; genus also includes W. mcgrewi (Robinson, 1968) and W. shifrae (Krishtalka, 1978).	

=== Other eutherians ===
- Putative Cretaceous metatherian Sinodelphys szalayi is reinterpreted as an early member of Eutheria by Bi et al. (2018).
- A study on the anatomy of the Early Cretaceous eutherian Endotherium niinomii is published by Wang et al. (2018), who consider this species to be a valid taxon.
- Napoli et al. (2018) digitally visualize and describe the endocast of a taeniodont Onychodectes tisonensis.
- A study evaluating when solenodons split from other eulipotyphlans, based on updated fossil calibrations, is published by Springer, Murphy & Roca (2018), who place the split between solenodons and other eulipotyphlans in the Late Cretaceous.
- Fragment of the mandible of the mole Mongoloscapter zhegalloi is described from the Late Oligocene Tsakhir-Ula locality (Mongolia) by Lopatin (2018), representing the second record of Mongoloscapter reported so far.
- A study comparing the size and morphology of the common shrew (Sorex araneus), Sorex runtonensis, the tundra shrew (S. tundrensis) and the Caucasian shrew (S. satununi) with the type material of the fossil shrew Sorex subaraneus (in order to either support or falsify the validity of S. subaraneus and the putative ancestry of the extant common shrew) is published by Rzebik-Kowalska & Pereswiet-Soltan (2018).
- A study on the phylogenetic relationships of the gymnure Deinogalerix within the tribe Galericini is published by Borrani et al. (2018).
- A study on the systematic usefulness of the humerus in proterotheriid litopterns is published by Corona, Perea & Ubilla (2018), who consider the species Proterotherium berroi Kraglievich (1930) to be a probable synonym of Neolicaphrium recens.
- A study on the diversity of shapes of snout in notoungulates and on the evolution of the wide range of shapes of snout in this group of mammals is published by Gomes Rodrigues et al. (2018).
- A study on the variation of teeth shape and on the factors affecting changes in the shape of teeth of notopithecid notoungulates is published by Scarano & Vera (2018).
- A study on the variation of teeth shape in late Miocene members of the hegetotheriid notoungulate genus Paedotherium, as well as its implications for the systematics and phylogenetic relationships of the late Miocene species of Paedotherium, is published by Ercoli et al. (2018).
- A study on the variability of the diagnostic characters in the fossils of members of the hegetotheriid notoungulate genus Tremacyllus is published by Sostillo, Cerdeño & Montalvo (2018), who consider the species T. incipiens to be a junior synonym of the species T. impressus.
- New fossil remains of pachyrukhine hegetotheriid notoungulates are described from the Huayquerías del Este (Mendoza, Argentina) by Vera & Ercoli (2018), who consider the species Tremacyllus subdiminutus to be a synonym of T. impressus.
- Fernández-Monescill et al. (2018) provide muscular reconstruction and infer functional properties of the forelimb of the mesotheriid notoungulate Plesiotypotherium achirense.
- A study on the tooth wear, tooth replacement and enamel microstructure in an perissodactyl-like ungulate Cambaytherium is published by von Koenigswald et al. (2018).
- Anatomical redescription of the periptychid species Periptychus carinidens is published by Shelley, Williamson & Brusatte (2018).
- Description of new fossil material of the hyaenodont species Prionogale breviceps from the Miocene of Kenya and Uganda, and a study on the anatomy of teeth of Namasector soriae, is published by Morales & Pickford (2018).
- Partial skull of Hyaenodon leptorhynchus is described from the Chattian deposits in Séon Saint-André (Marseille, France) by Solé et al. (2018).
- A study on the early Pleistocene leporid fossils from the Roland Springs Ranch Locality 1 (Texas, United States), considered against the backdrop of Neogene-Quaternary faunal turnover that included the radiation within the subfamily Leporinae, is published by Moretti (2018).

Name	Novelty	Status	Authors	Age	Unit	Location	Notes	Images
Ambolestes	Gen. et sp. nov	Valid	Bi et al.	Early Cretaceous	Yixian Formation	China	An early eutherian. Genus includes new species A. zhoui.	
Arcius hookeri	Sp. nov	Valid	López-Torres & Silcox	Early Eocene	Blackheath Beds	United Kingdom	A member of Plesiadapiformes belonging to the family Paromomyidae.	
Arcius ilerdensis	Sp. nov	Valid	López-Torres & Silcox	Early Eocene		Spain	Originally described as a member of Plesiadapiformes belonging to the family Paromomyidae and a species of Arcius; Beard & Métais (2024) reinterpreted it as a member of Apatotheria belonging to the family Apatemyidae and a species of Heterohyus.	
Chiromyoides mauberti	Sp. nov	Valid	De Bast, Gagnaison & Smith	Late Paleocene		France	A member of Plesiadapiformes belonging to the family Plesiadapidae.	
Darbonetus sigei	Sp. nov	Valid	Hooker	Eocene (Priabonian)		France	A member of the family Nyctitheriidae.	
Dissacus raslanloubatieri	Sp. nov	Valid	Solé et al.	Eocene (Ypresian)		France	A member of the family Mesonychidae.	
Dissacus rougierae	Sp. nov	Valid	Solé et al.	Eocene (Ypresian)		France	A member of the family Mesonychidae.	
Eomorphippus bondi	Sp. nov	Valid	Wyss, Flynn & Croft	Early Oligocene	Abanico Formation	Chile	A notohippid notoungulate.	
Eomorphippus neilopdykei	Sp. nov	Valid	Wyss, Flynn & Croft	Early Oligocene	Abanico Formation	Chile	A notohippid notoungulate.	
Falcontoxodon	Gen. et sp. nov	Valid	Carrillo et al.	Early Pliocene–late Pliocene or early Pleistocene	Falcón Basin (Codore Formation; San Gregorio Formation)	Venezuela	A member of Toxodontidae. Genus includes new species F. aguilerai.	
Ferrequitherium	Gen. et sp. nov	Valid	Scott	Paleocene (early Tiffanian)	Paskapoo Formation	Canada (Alberta)	A relative of Horolodectes. Genus includes new species F. sweeti.	
Hilarcotherium miyou	Sp. nov	Valid	Carrillo et al.	Middle Miocene	Castilletes Formation	Colombia	A member of Astrapotheriidae.	
Hovurlestes	Gen. et sp. nov	Valid	Lopatin & Averianov	Early Cretaceous (Aptian–Albian)	Höovör locality	Mongolia	A basal member of Eutheria. The type species is H. noyon.	
Llullataruca	Gen. et sp. nov	Valid	McGrath, Anaya & Croft	Laventan		Bolivia	A member of Litopterna belonging the family Macraucheniidae. Genus includes new species L. shockeyi.	
Platychoerops boyeri	Sp. nov	Valid	De Bast, Gagnaison & Smith	Late Paleocene		France	A member of Plesiadapiformes belonging to the family Plesiadapidae.	
Plesiadapis berruensis	Sp. nov	Valid	Jehle et al.	Late Paleocene		France	A member of Plesiadapiformes.	
Plesiadapis ploegi	Sp. nov	Valid	De Bast, Gagnaison & Smith	Late Paleocene		France	A member of Plesiadapiformes belonging to the family Plesiadapidae.	
Propterodon panganensis	Sp. nov	Valid	De Bonis et al.	Middle Eocene	Pondaung Formation	Myanmar	A member of the family Hyaenodontidae.	
Rosendo	Gen. et comb. nov	Valid	Wyss, Flynn & Croft	Early Oligocene	Sarmiento Formation	Argentina; Chile	A notohippid notoungulate; a new genus for "Eomorphippus" pascuali Simpson (1967).	
Rusconitherium	Gen. et comb. nov	Valid	Cerdeño, Vera & Combina	Early Miocene	Mariño Formation	Argentina	A mesotheriid notoungulate; a new genus for "Trachytherus" mendocensis Simpson & Minoprio (1949).	
Sardolagus	Gen. et sp. nov	Valid	Angelone et al.	Early Pleistocene		Italy	A member of the family Leporidae. Genus includes new species S. obscurus.	
Shargainosorex	Gen. et sp. nov	Valid	Zazhigin & Voyta	Middle Miocene	Oshin Suite	Mongolia	A shrew belonging to the subfamily Crocidosoricinae. The type species is S. angustirostris.	
Termastherium	Gen. et sp. nov	Valid	Wyss, Flynn & Croft	Early Oligocene	Abanico Formation	Chile	A leontiniid notoungulate. Genus includes new species T. flacoensis.	
'Theosodon' arozquetai	Sp. nov	Valid	McGrath, Anaya & Croft	Laventan		Bolivia	A member of Litopterna belonging the family Macraucheniidae, tentatively referred to the genus Theosodon.	
Wyonycteris kingi	Sp. nov	Valid	Hooker	Paleogene	Woolwich	United Kingdom	A member of the family Nyctitheriidae. Announced in 2018; the final version of the article naming it was published in 2020.	
Xotodon caravela	Sp. nov	Valid	Armella, García-López & Dominguez	Late Miocene-early Pliocene	Aconquija Formation	Argentina		
Zofiagale	Gen. et sp. nov	Valid	López-Torres & Fostowicz-Frelik	Late Eocene	Ergilin Dzo Formation	Mongolia	A relative of Anagale. The type species is Z. ergilinensis.	

== Other mammals ==
- A diverse footprint assemblage dominated by small mammal tracks is described from the Lower Cretaceous Patuxent Formation (Maryland, United States) by Stanford et al. (2018), who name a new mammal ichnotaxon Sederipes goddardensis.
- A description of the middle ear ossicles of Arboroharamiya is published by Meng et al. (2018).
- Asymmetric bicrural stapes is reported in the Jurassic multituberculate Pseudobolodon oreas by Schultz, Ruf & Martin (2018).
- New specimens of the cladotherian species Palaeoxonodon ooliticus (two partial dentaries) are described from the Middle Jurassic Kilmaluag Formation (Isle of Skye, Scotland, United Kingdom) by Panciroli, Benson & Butler (2018).
- A fossil trackway produced by a mouse-sized primitive mammal, assigned to the ichnotaxon Ameghinichnus patagonicus, and deviating from the usual bilateral symmetry of posture and motion, is described from the Middle Jurassic of Patagonia, Argentina by Kuznetsov & Panyutina (2018), who interpret the tracks as most likely produced by a mammal carrying a heavy load on the left side of its body, plausibly a milk-producing mother carrying her babies.

Name	Novelty	Status	Authors	Age	Unit	Location	Notes	Images
Brasilestes	Gen. et sp. nov		Castro et al.	Late Cretaceous	Adamantina Formation	Brazil	An early member of Tribosphenida. The type species is B. stardusti.	
Catopsalis kakwa	Sp. nov	Valid	Scott, Weil & Theodor	Early Paleocene		Canada (Alberta)	A multituberculate belonging to the group Taeniolabidoidea.	
Cifelliodon	Gen. et sp. nov	Valid	Huttenlocker et al.	Early Cretaceous	Cedar Mountain Formation	United States (Utah)	A member of Haramiyida belonging to the family Hahnodontidae. The type species is C. wahkarmoosuch.	
Golercosmodon	Gen. et sp. nov	Valid	Lofgren et al.	Paleocene (Tiffanian)	Goler Formation	United States (California)	A multituberculate. Genus includes new species G. mylesi.	
Khorotherium	Gen. et sp. nov	Valid	Averianov et al.	Early Cretaceous (?Berriasian-Barremian)	Batylykh Formation	Russia (Sakha Republic)	A member of Docodonta belonging to the family Tegotheriidae. The type species is K. yakutensis.	
Litovoi	Gen. et sp. nov	Disputed	Csiki-Sava et al.	Late Cretaceous (Maastrichtian)		Romania	A multituberculate belonging to the family Kogaionidae. The type species is L. tholocephalos. Smith et al. (2021) considered it to be a junior synonym of Barbatodon transylvanicus.	
Sangarotherium	Gen. et sp. nov	Valid	Averianov et al.	Early Cretaceous (?Berriasian-Barremian)	Batylykh Formation	Russia (Sakha Republic)	A member of Eutriconodonta of uncertain phylogenetic placement. The type species is S. aquilonium.	
