= Horolodectes =

Horolodectes Temporal range: Late Paleocene

Scientific classification
- Kingdom: Animalia
- Phylum: Chordata
- Class: Mammalia
- Clade: Eutheria
- Family: †Horolodectidae
- Genus: †Horolodectes; Scott et al. 2006

Type species
- Horolodectes sunae

Extinct genus of mammals

Horolodectes sunae is a prehistoric eutherian mammal species from the Late Paleocene of northern Alberta, Canada. The generic name means "hourglass biter" in Greek in direct reference of the hourglass-shape of its teeth.

Horolodectes, along with the slightly older genus Ferrequitherium, belongs to the family Horolodectidae.

== Description ==
The dentition of Horolodectes comprises trenchant, posteriorly leaning premolars and comparatively primitive molars, which indicate a masticatory cycle that consisted primarily of shearing and, to a lesser degree, horizontal grinding. Because of the blade-like formation of some of its teeth, Horolodectes is thought to have been carnivorous, likely eating insects and grubs.

The animal is judged to have been roughly 10 centimeters in length, and have been covered in fur.

== Ecology ==
Horolodectes lived in the period 60 million years ago, geologically recently after the extinction of the dinosaurs, during which many small mammals were rapidly diversifying and filling new ecological niches.

== Range ==
This animal is only known from specimens in Alberta. Remains have been found near the Blindman River and Drayton Valley
