= Homiphoca =

Homiphoca Temporal range: Pliocene

Scientific classification
- Kingdom: Animalia
- Phylum: Chordata
- Class: Mammalia
- Order: Carnivora
- Parvorder: Pinnipedia
- Family: Phocidae
- Subfamily: Monachinae
- Genus: †Homiphoca; Muizon and Hendey, 1980

Species
- H. capensis (Hendey and Repenning, 1972) (type species); H. murfreesi Hafed et al., 2022

Extinct genus of carnivores

Homiphoca is an extinct genus of earless seals from the Pliocene of South Africa.

== Taxonomy ==
The type species of Homiphoca, H. capensis, was originally described as a species of the dubious delphinoid Prionodelphis, P. capensis. Later analysis in 1980 showed that P. capensis was a pinniped and not a cetacean, necessitating erection of the new genus Homiphoca. Cladistic analysis places Homiphoca as a member of Lobodontini, which includes the crabeater, Weddell, Ross, and leopard seals.

== Fossils ==
Homiphoca remains are known with certainty only from Langebaanweg, South Africa. Remains from Pliocene deposits in Florida and the Lee Creek Mine, North Carolina, have been referred to the genus, although Berta et al. (2015) questioned this referral based on results of their cladistic analysis of Pliophoca.
