= Stryfnotherium =

Stryfnotherium Temporal range: Late Miocene

Scientific classification
- Kingdom: Animalia
- Phylum: Chordata
- Class: Mammalia
- Order: Artiodactyla
- Family: Bovidae
- Genus: †Stryfnotherium
- Species: †S. exophthalmon

Binomial name
- †Stryfnotherium exophthalmon Kostopoulos & Soubise, 2018

Extinct genus of mammals

Stryfnotherium is an extinct genus of bovid that inhabited Greece during the Late Miocene. It contains the species S. exophthalmon.
