= Anomalomyidae =

Anomalomyidae Temporal range: Early Miocene–Early Pleistocene

Scientific classification
- Kingdom: Animalia
- Phylum: Chordata
- Class: Mammalia
- Infraclass: Placentalia
- Order: Rodentia
- Superfamily: Muroidea
- Family: †Anomalomyidae; Schaub, 1925

Genera
- †Anomalomys †Anomalospalax †Prospalax

Extinct family of rodents

Anomalomyidae is a family of extinct muroid rodents from Europe.
