= Taikicetus =

Taikicetus Temporal range: Middle Miocene, 15.2–11.5 Ma

Scientific classification
- Domain: Eukaryota
- Kingdom: Animalia
- Phylum: Chordata
- Class: Mammalia
- Order: Artiodactyla
- Suborder: Whippomorpha
- Infraorder: Cetacea
- Genus: †Taikicetus; Tanaka, Ando, and Sawamura, 2018
- Species: †T. inouei

Binomial name
- †Taikicetus inouei Tanaka, Ando, and Sawamura, 2018

Extinct genus of whales

Taikicetus is a genus of basal thalassothere baleen whale from the Middle Miocene of Japan.

== Classification ==
Phylogenetic analysis recovers Taikicetus as a basal thalassothere more primitive than Cetotheriidae and Balaenopteroidea.

== Description ==
Taikicetus is distinguished from other closely related thalassotheres by an anteriorly swollen short zygomatic process (length vs width of the zygomatic process; high triangular coronoid process; and weak angular process, which does not reach as far posterior as the mandibular condyle; outline of suture between maxillae and palatines forming a posteriorly pointing V-shape, convex lateral edge of supraoccipital convex in dorsal view, tip of postglenoid process in lateral view pointing ventrally, and outline of postglenoid process distinctly wider than high in anterior or posterior view.
