= Andre Wyss =

American paleontologist

Andre Wyss is a professor of Paleontology at the University of California, Santa Barbara. He is best known for his contributions in the field of evolution, especially in small mammals of South America and Africa.
