= Shapajamys =

Shapajamys Temporal range: Early Oligocene

Scientific classification
- Kingdom: Animalia
- Phylum: Chordata
- Class: Mammalia
- Order: Rodentia
- Parvorder: Caviomorpha
- Genus: †Shapajamys; Boivin et al., 2018

Type species
- Shapajamys labocensis Boivin et al., 2018

Other species
- Shapajamys minor Arnal et al., 2022

Extinct genus of caviomorph rodent

Shapajamys is an extinct genus of caviomorph rodent that lived in South America during the Rupelian stage of the Oligocene epoch.

== Description ==
Shapajamys minor can be distinguished from the type species, Shapajamys labocensis, on the basis of the former's smaller body size, possession of four main crests on its maxillary molars, and possession of a more pronounced constriction separating the ectolophid from the labial end of metalophulid II on the mandibular molars.

== Palaeobiology ==
=== Diet ===
Dental microwear suggests that S. labocensis consumed foods with hard textures.
