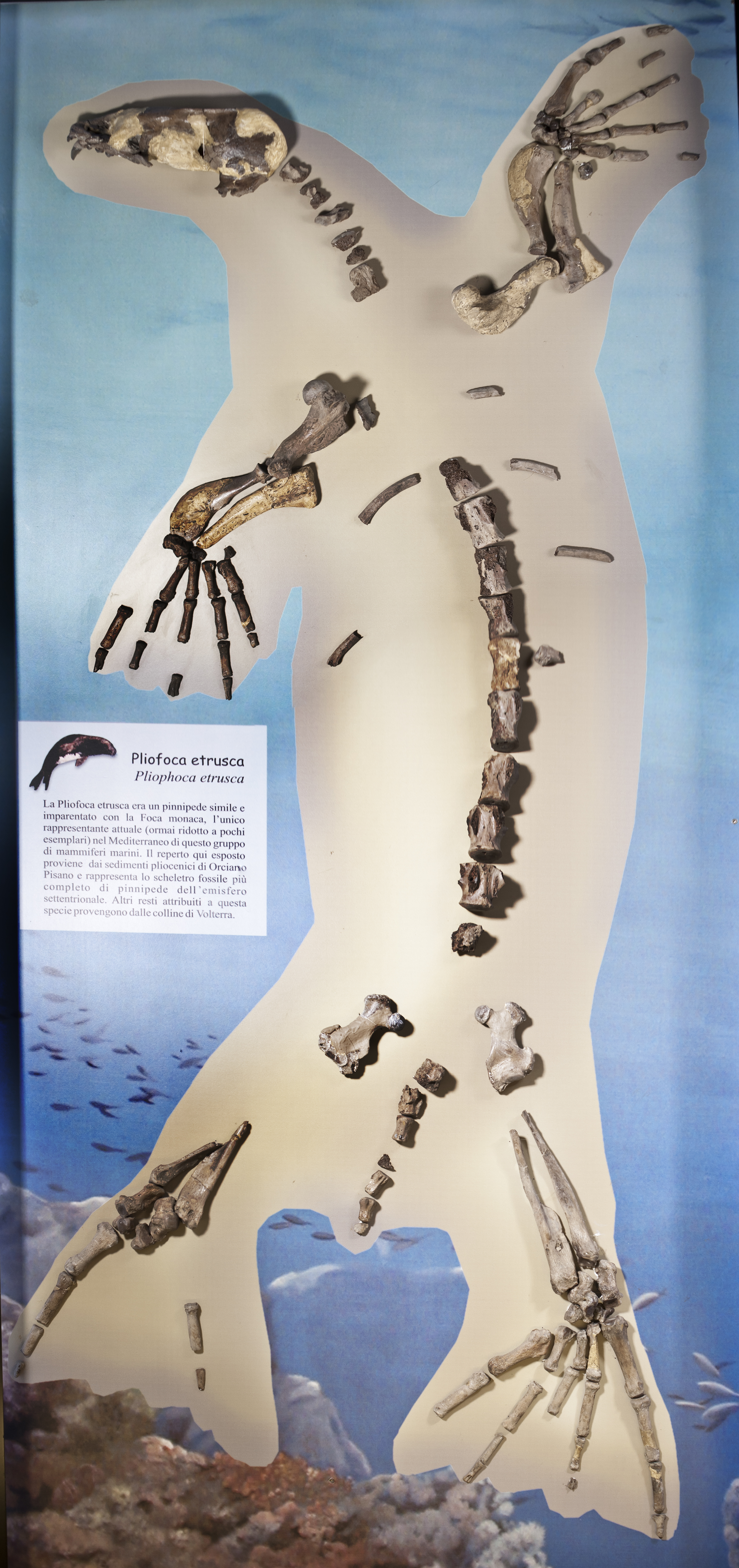
- Holotype of Pliophoca etrusca

Scientific classification
- Kingdom: Animalia
- Phylum: Chordata
- Class: Mammalia
- Order: Carnivora
- Parvorder: Pinnipedia
- Family: Phocidae
- Genus: †Pliophoca; Tavani, 1941

Species
- P. etrusca Tavani 1941 (type)

= Pliophoca =

Pliophoca Temporal range: late Pliocene

Extinct genus of carnivores

Pliophoca is an extinct genus of seal in the family Phocidae.

== Fossil record ==
This genus is known from late Pliocene (Piacenzian) marine deposits in northern Italy. Numerous disassociated monachine remains from the Lee Creek Mine of North Carolina were assigned by Koretsky and Ray (2008), but Berta et al. (2015) rejected the referral and suggested that they may be distinct, which was confirmed by Dewaele et al. (2018), who erected Auroraphoca for two of the Lee Creek specimens that Koretsky and Ray (2008) assigned to Pliophoca.

This fossil species of seal, ancestor of the Mediterranean monk seal (Monachus monachus) has been found only in late Pliocene (Piacenzian) deposits at Orciano and Volterra in Tuscany. It was a species endemic to the Mediterranean Sea.

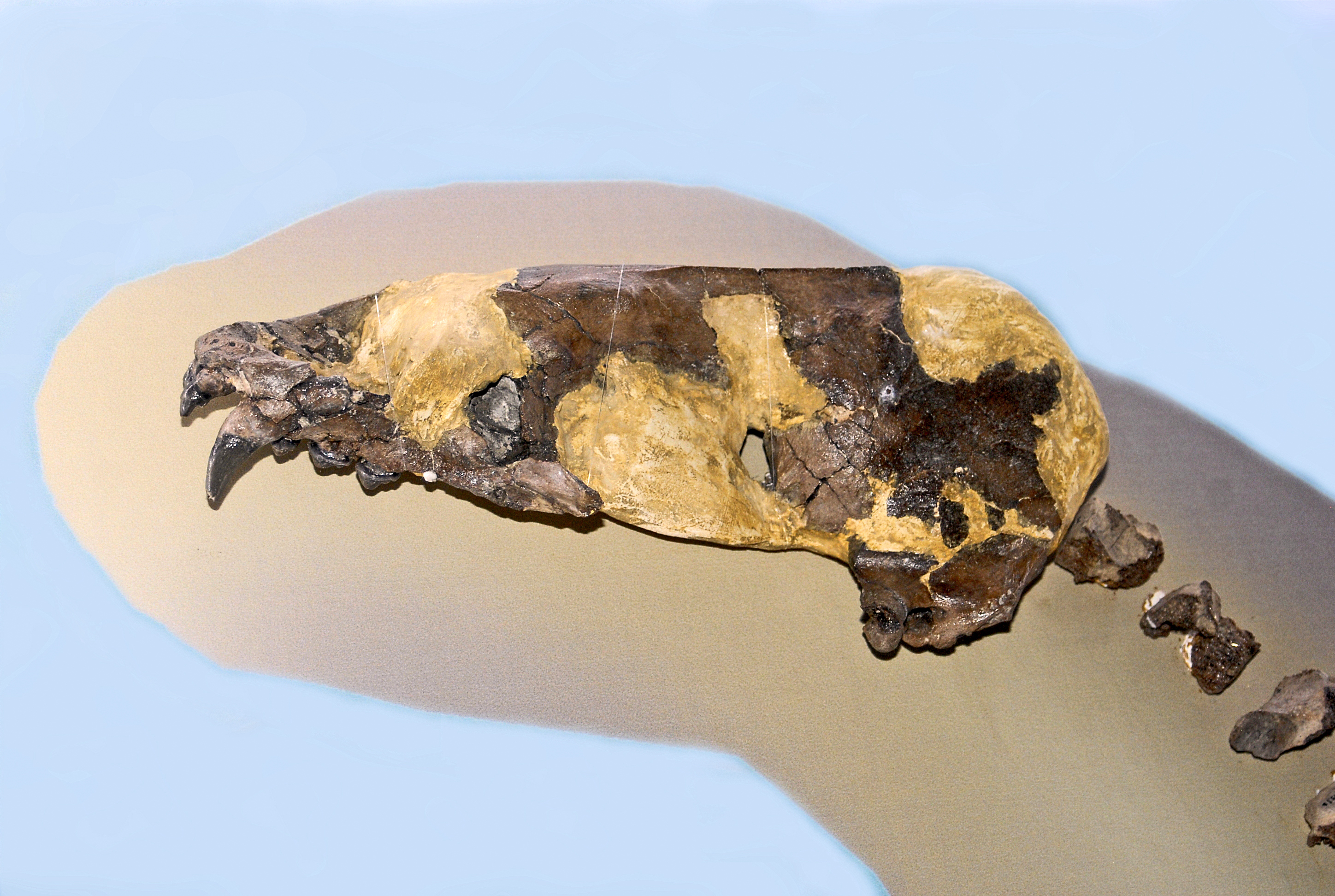
Fossil skull of Pliophoca etrusca

== Bibliography ==
- G. Tavani. 1941. Revisione dei resti del pinnipede conservato nel museo di geologia di Pisa. Palaeontographica Italica 40:97-112
- T. A. Demere, A. Berta, and P. J. Adam. 2003. Pinnipedimorph evolutionary biogeography. Bulletin of the American Museum of Natural History 279:32-76
- Roberto Lawley. 1875. Pesci ed altri vertebrati fossili del pliocene toscano. Letta all'adunanza della Società Toscana di Scienze Naturali. Pisa, Tipografia Nistri
- Roberto Lawley. 1876. Nuovi studi sopra ai pesci ed altri vertebrati fossili delle Colline Toscane. Firenze. Tipografia dell’Arte della Stampa.
- R. Ugolini. 1902. Il Monachus albiventer BODD. del pliocene di Orciano. Palaeontographia Italica. Volume VIII. pag. 1-20, tav. I-III [I-III], fig. 1.
- R. Ugolini. 1902. Resti di foche fossili italiane. Atti Soc. Tosc. di Sc. Nat. Pisa, Memorie, vol.XIX, 1902, pag.13, con 1 tav. -
