= Chambius =

Chambius Temporal range: Ypresian–Lutetian

Scientific classification
- Kingdom: Animalia
- Phylum: Chordata
- Class: Mammalia
- Infraclass: Placentalia
- Order: Macroscelidea
- Family: Macroscelididae
- Genus: †Chambius
- Species: †C. kasserinensis

Binomial name
- †Chambius kasserinensis Hartenberger, 1986

Extinct genus of

Chambius is an extinct monotypic genus of herodotiine sengi that lived in North Africa during the Eocene epoch.

== Description ==
Chambius differs from other members of the subfamily Herodontiinae in having a P_{1} with a single root, a P_{2} and P_{3} with a small paraconid, a P_{4} with a hypoconulid, small entoconid, and a metaconid positioned distally to the protoconid. Other autapomorphies include a P^{4} with a small hypocone, an M^{1} and M^{2} with postprotocristae and prominent metaconules, and an M_{2} with a reduced talonid basin.
