= Auroraphoca =

Auroraphoca Temporal range: early Pliocene

Scientific classification
- Kingdom: Animalia
- Phylum: Chordata
- Class: Mammalia
- Order: Carnivora
- Parvorder: Pinnipedia
- Family: Phocidae
- Subfamily: Monachinae
- Genus: †Auroraphoca; Dewaele, Peredo, Meyvisch, and Louwye, 2018

Species
- A. atlantica Dewaele, Peredo, Meyvisch, and Louwye, 2018 (type species)

Extinct genus of carnivores

Auroraphoca is an extinct genus of earless seals from the early Pliocene of what is now the U.S. Eastern Seaboard.

== Description ==
Auroraphoca differs from other monachines by the abrupt distal termination of the deltopectoral crest, and the presence of a reduced and distally located epicondylar crest. It is most similar to Pliophoca in the development of the anconeal process on the ulna, and because of this, the holotype USNM 181419 and paratype USNM 250290 were referred to Pliophoca by Koretsky and Ray (2008).
