= Protozetamys =

Protozetamys Temporal range: Middle Eocene

Scientific classification
- Kingdom: Animalia
- Phylum: Chordata
- Class: Mammalia
- Infraclass: Placentalia
- Order: Rodentia
- Genus: Protozetamys; Ferrusquia-Villafranca et al., 2018
- Species: P. mixtecus

Binomial name
- Protozetamys mixtecus Ferrusquia-Villafranca et al., 2018

Protozetamys is an extinct genus of rodent that inhabited Mexico during the Eocene epoch. It is a monotypic genus that contains the species P. mixtecus.

== Palaeoecology ==
Protozetamys mixtecus shows adaptations for a diet rich in fibrous or abrasive foods.
