= Erihippus =

Erihippus Temporal range: Ypresian

Scientific classification
- Kingdom: Animalia
- Phylum: Chordata
- Class: Mammalia
- Order: Perissodactyla
- Family: Equidae
- Genus: †Erihippus
- Species: †E. tingae

Binomial name
- †Erihippus tingae Bai et al., 2018

Extinct genus of equid

Erihippus is an extinct genus of equid that lived during the early Ypresian stage of the Eocene epoch.

== Distribution ==
Erihippus tingae is known from the Lingcha Formation of China.
