= Alormys =

Alormys Temporal range: Holocene

Scientific classification
- Kingdom: Animalia
- Phylum: Chordata
- Class: Mammalia
- Infraclass: Placentalia
- Order: Rodentia
- Family: Muridae
- Subfamily: Murinae
- Genus: †Alormys; Louys, 2018
- Species: †A. aplini

Binomial name
- †Alormys aplini Louys, 2018

Extinct genus of giant rat

Alormys is a genus of extinct murid that lived on Alor Island (Indonesia) during the Holocene period. Their fossils were first noticed in the Tron Bon Lei rockshelter and also owl roost deposit on Makpan. They were large rodents, superficially most closely resembling Milimonggamys of Sumba and Papagomys on Flores. Based on its relatively unspecialized moderately hypsodont teeth and the isotype, Alormys is said to probably have an almost exclusively plant-based diet. Interestingly, authors from the describing paper wrote that it is possible for the taxa to be still alive and waiting to be rediscovered although it is very unlikely. Carbon dating from the specimen indicated that they went extinct around 2000 years ago.
