= Orcemys =

Orcemys Temporal range: Early Pleistocene

Scientific classification
- Kingdom: Animalia
- Phylum: Chordata
- Class: Mammalia
- Infraclass: Placentalia
- Order: Rodentia
- Family: Cricetidae
- Subfamily: Arvicolinae
- Genus: †Orcemys; Martin et al., 2018
- Species: †O. giberti

Binomial name
- †Orcemys giberti Martin et al., 2018

Extinct genus of arvicoline rodent

Orcemys is an extinct genus of arvicoline rodent that lived during the Early Pleistocene.

== Distribution ==
Orcemys giberti is known from Spain.
