= Bustrania =

Bustrania Temporal range: Eocene

Scientific classification
- Kingdom: Animalia
- Phylum: Chordata
- Class: Mammalia
- Order: Rodentia
- Family: Muridae
- Subfamily: †Pappocricetodontinae
- Genus: †Bustrania; De Brujin et al., 2018
- Species: †B. dissimile

Binomial name
- †Bustrania dissimile De Brujin et al., 2018

Extinct genus of rodents

Bustrania is an extinct genus of pappocricetodontine rodent that lived in Balkanatolia during the Eocene epoch.

== Distribution ==
Bustrania dissimile is known from fossils unearthed in Serbia.

== Description ==
Bustrania had narrow incisors and a smooth anterior enamel surface on them. Its Hunter-Schreger bands (HSBs) were orientated transversely in a K1-type enamel microstructure.
