= Mayomys =

Mayomys Temporal range: Early Oligocene

Scientific classification
- Kingdom: Animalia
- Phylum: Chordata
- Class: Mammalia
- Infraclass: Placentalia
- Order: Rodentia
- Superfamily: Octodontoidea
- Genus: †Mayomys
- Species: †M. confluens

Binomial name
- †Mayomys confluens Boivin et al., 2018

Extinct genus of rodents

Mayomys is an extinct genus of octodontoid that lived during the Rupelian stage of the Oligocene epoch.

== Distribution ==
Mayomys confluens is known from the Pozo Formation of Peru.
