= Marylène Patou-Mathis =

French prehistorian (born 1955)

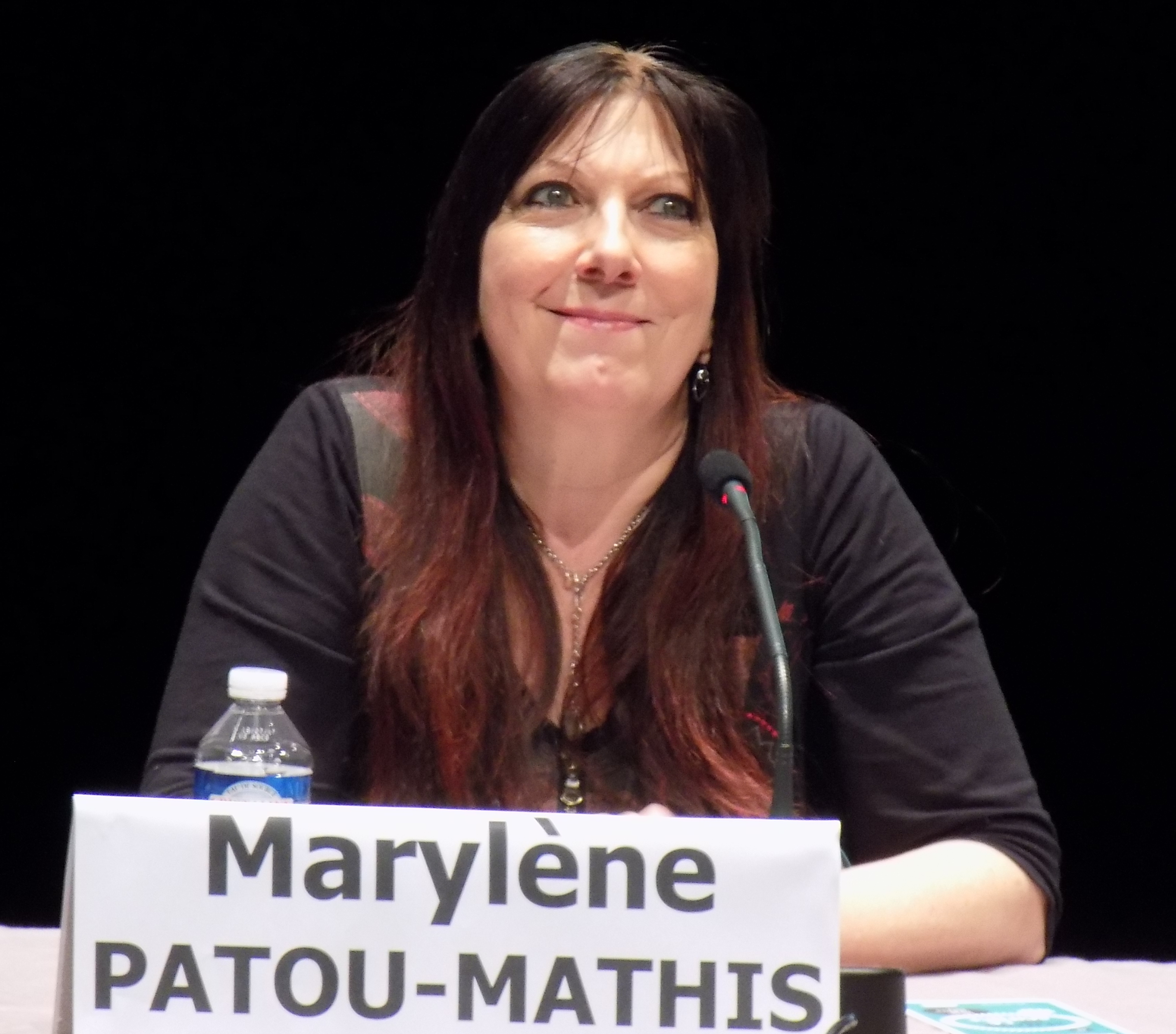
- Patou-Mathis in 2016
- Born: 16 June 1955 (age 71); Paris, France
- Education: Pierre and Marie Curie University; Université de Paris I-Sorbonne
- Occupation: Prehistorian researcher

Marylène Patou-Mathis (born 16 June 1955 in Paris), is a French prehistorian academic and a specialist in the behavior of the Neanderthals and the San people. She studies the place of women in these societies and has questioned the projections of other prehistorians on women's roles in ancient times.

== Biography ==
Patou-Mathis studied at the Pierre and Marie Curie University (Paris VI) and earned a master's degree in geology. She then specialized in prehistory with a diploma of advanced studies (DEA) in Quaternary geology, human paleontology and prehistory, at the same university in 1981. She defended her doctoral thesis there in prehistory in 1984. In 1999, she completed her Habilitation degree at the Université de Paris I-Sorbonne.

Before joining the National Center for Scientific Research (CNRS) in 1989, she lived for three months among the San people, hunter-gatherers of the Kalahari Desert in Botswana.

During her career, she has worked on the behavior of Neanderthal society and questioned the place of women in prehistory and is quoted as saying, "There is no evidence at present that Paleolithic societies were patriarchal." The first studies in the 19th century considered the Neanderthal to be a violent being with a limited brain, but the work of Patou-Mathis has presented evidence countering that image such as their use of medicinal plants, care of dependent clan members, treatment of fractures and burial of their dead with funeral rites. She has deconstructed the image of Paleolithic societies that implied that tasks were distributed according to the sex of the person, where women had a lower status than men, and she has said these theories have not been supported by archaeological evidence. She maintains that these remote societies may have been matrilineal or even matriarchal in nature.

Patou-Mathis curated Neanderthal, The Exhibition, at the Musée de l’Homme (Museum of Man) in Paris, from 28 March 2018, to 7 January 2019.

== Academic background ==
In the Prehistory department of the National Museum of Natural History (MNHN), Patou-Mathis was the vice-president of the scientific council from 2011 to 2014 and director from 2013 to 2018 of the team "Behavior of Neanderthals and anatomically modern humans placed in their paleo-ecological context" of the joint research unit UMR 7194 of the CNRS. Since January 2019, she has served as deputy director of the UMR 7194.

== Distinctions ==
- 2014: Knight of the Legion of Honor
- 2002: Prize from the Chancellery of the Universities of Paris
- 1995: Singer-Polignac Foundation Medal
- 1984: Laureate of the Vocation Foundation
