= Orophodon =

Orophodon Temporal range: Late Oligocene (Deseadan) ~28.0–23.0 Ma

Scientific classification
- Kingdom: Animalia
- Phylum: Chordata
- Class: Mammalia
- Order: Pilosa
- Suborder: Folivora
- Family: †Mylodontidae
- Genus: †Orophodon; Ameghino, 1894
- Species: †O. hapaloides

Binomial name
- †Orophodon hapaloides Ameghino, 1894

Extinct genus of ground sloths

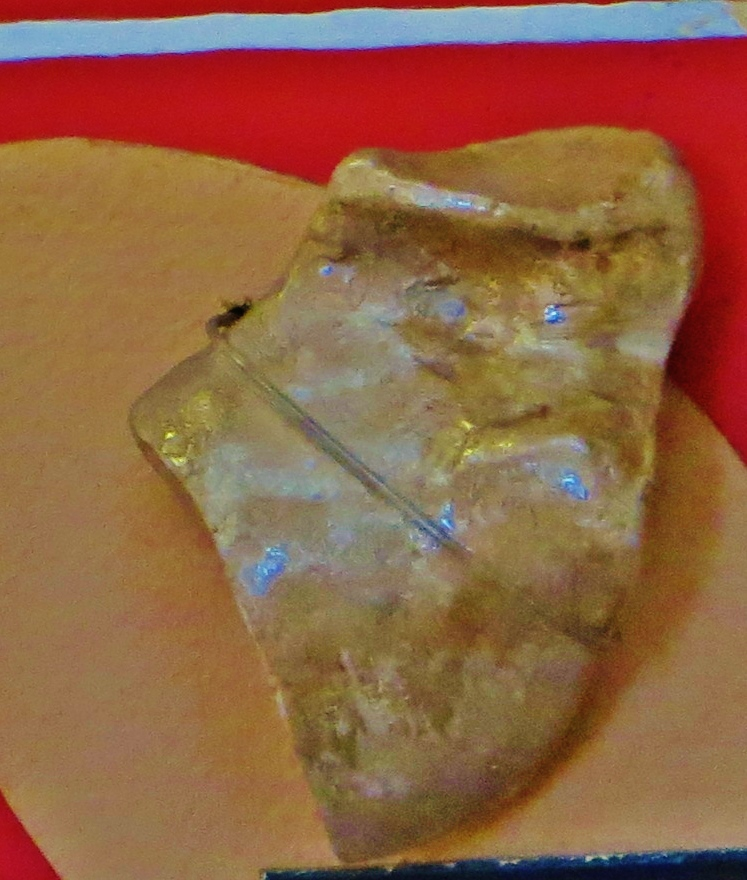
Tooth of an Orophodon

Orophodon is an extinct genus of ground sloth of the family Mylodontidae, endemic to Argentina, South America.

== Taxonomy ==
Orophodon was named by Florentino Ameghino in 1894. It was assigned to Mylodontidae by Carroll in 1988.

== Palaeoecology ==
O. hapaloides was a generalist herbivore able to feed on a wide variety of different plants.

Orophodon lived with various Notoungulata, Sparassodonta, rodents, birds, etc. It is thought that O. hapaloides was preyed on by some species of Sebecidae and Phorusrhacidae like Dynamopterus.
