= Aepyocricetus =

Aepyocricetus Temporal range: Early Pliocene

Scientific classification
- Kingdom: Animalia
- Phylum: Chordata
- Class: Mammalia
- Infraclass: Placentalia
- Order: Rodentia
- Family: Cricetidae
- Subfamily: Cricetinae
- Genus: †Aepyocricetus
- Species: †A. liuae

Binomial name
- †Aepyocricetus liuae Li et al., 2017

Extinct genus of rodents

Aepyocricetus is an extinct genus of cricetine rodent that lived in the Tibetan Plateau during the Zanclean stage of the Pliocene epoch. It is a monotypic genus containing the species A. liuae.
