= Meles magnus =

Meles magnus Temporal range: Early Pleistocene

Scientific classification
- Kingdom: Animalia
- Phylum: Chordata
- Class: Mammalia
- Infraclass: Placentalia
- Order: Carnivora
- Family: Mustelidae
- Genus: Meles
- Species: †M. magnus

Binomial name
- †Meles magnus Jiangzuo et al., 2018

Extinct species of mammal

Meles magnus is an extinct species of Meles that lived in East Asia during the Pleistocene epoch.

== Distribution ==
Meles magnus fossils are known from the Liucheng Gigantopithecus Cave in Guangxi.
