= Selvamys =

Selvamys Temporal range: Early Oligocene

Scientific classification
- Kingdom: Animalia
- Phylum: Chordata
- Class: Mammalia
- Infraclass: Placentalia
- Order: Rodentia
- Superfamily: Octodontoidea
- Genus: †Selvamys; Boivin et al., 2018
- Species: †S. paulus

Binomial name
- †Selvamys paulus Boivin et al., 2018

Extinct genus of octodontoid rodents

Selvamys is an extinct genus of octodontoid rodent that lived in South America during the Rupelian stage of the Oligocene epoch.

== Distribution ==
Selvamys paulus is known from deposits of the Oligocene-aged Pozo Formation of Peru.
