= Tlaxcallicetus =

Tlaxcallicetus Temporal range: Late Oligocene

Scientific classification
- Kingdom: Animalia
- Phylum: Chordata
- Class: Mammalia
- Order: Artiodactyla
- Suborder: Whippomorpha
- Infraorder: Cetacea
- Parvorder: Mysticeti
- Genus: †Tlaxcallicetus
- Species: †T. guaycurae

Binomial name
- †Tlaxcallicetus guaycurae Hernández Cisneros, 2018

Extinct genus of cetaceans

Tlaxcallicetus is an extinct genus of mysticete that inhabited Baja California Sur during the Late Oligocene. It contains the species T. guaycurae.
