= Lapazomys =

Lapazomys Temporal range: Late Oligocene

Scientific classification
- Kingdom: Animalia
- Phylum: Chordata
- Class: Mammalia
- Infraclass: Placentalia
- Order: Rodentia
- Parvorder: Caviomorpha
- Genus: Lapazomys; Pérez et al., 2018
- Species: L. hartenbergeri

Binomial name
- Lapazomys hartenbergeri Pérez et al., 2018

Extinct genus of rodents

Lapazomys is an extinct genus of caviomorph rodent that lived in Bolivia during the Late Oligocene. It contains a single species, L. hartenbergeri.
