= Kwanzacetus =

Kwanzacetus Temporal range: Late Miocene

Scientific classification
- Kingdom: Animalia
- Phylum: Chordata
- Class: Mammalia
- Infraclass: Placentalia
- Order: Artiodactyla
- Infraorder: Cetacea
- Family: Iniidae
- Genus: †Kwanzacetus
- Species: †K. khoisani

Binomial name
- †Kwanzacetus khoisani Lambert et al., 2018

Extinct genus of dolphins

Kwanzacetus is an extinct genus of iniid that inhabited Angola during the Miocene epoch. It contains the species K. khoisani.
