= Ferrequitherium =

Ferrequitherium Temporal range: Palaeocene

Scientific classification
- Kingdom: Animalia
- Phylum: Chordata
- Class: Mammalia
- Family: †Horolodectidae
- Genus: †Ferrequitherium
- Species: †F. sweeti

Binomial name
- †Ferrequitherium sweeti Scott, 2018

Extinct genus of mammals

Ferrequitherium is an extinct genus of horolodectid mammal that lived in Alberta during the Palaeocene epoch. It contains the species F. sweeti.
