= Toipahautea =

Toipahautea Temporal range: Late Oligocene, 27.5 Ma

Scientific classification
- Domain: Eukaryota
- Kingdom: Animalia
- Phylum: Chordata
- Class: Mammalia
- Order: Artiodactyla
- Infraorder: Cetacea
- Parvorder: Mysticeti
- Genus: †Toipahautea; Tsai and Fordyce, 2018

Type species
- Toipahautea waitaki Tsai and Fordyce, 2018

Extinct genus of whales

Toipahautea is a genus of baleen whale from the Late Oligocene (Chattian) Kokoamu Greensand of New Zealand.

== Classification ==
Phylogenetic analysis recovers Toipahautea outside crown Mysticeti but more derived than Eomysticetidae, like Horopeta and Whakakai.

== Description ==
Diagnostic features of Toipahautea include: massive periotic; well-developed superior process of the periotic; prominent elongation of dorsomedial margin of the internal acoustic meatus; prominent fissure between the fenestra rotunda and the aperture for the cochlear aqueduct; small medial posterior sulcus; the presence of the anteroexternal foramen; the presence of the sigmoidal cavity; the presence of the elliptical foramen; horizontal sigmoidal cleft far anterior than the anterior margin of the sigmoidal process; posteromedial margin of the bulla orienting slightly anteromedially.

== Paleobiology ==
Toipahautea has been recovered in the same deposits that have also yielded the primitive odontocetes Awamokoa, Austrosqualodon, Otekaikea, and Waipatia, the eomysticetids Matapanui, Tohoraata, Tokarahia, and Waharoa, and the balaenomorphs Mauicetus, Whakakai, and Horopeta.
