= Whakakai =

Whakakai Temporal range: Late Oligocene, 27–25 Ma

Scientific classification
- Domain: Eukaryota
- Kingdom: Animalia
- Phylum: Chordata
- Class: Mammalia
- Order: Artiodactyla
- Infraorder: Cetacea
- Parvorder: Mysticeti
- Genus: †Whakakai; Tsai and Fordyce, 2016

Type species
- Whakakai waipata Tsai and Fordyce, 2016

Extinct genus of whales

Whakakai is a genus of baleen whale from the Late Oligocene (Chattian) Kokoamu Greensand of New Zealand.

== Classification ==
Phylogenetic analysis recovers Whakakai outside crown Mysticeti as the sister taxon of Horopeta.

== Paleobiology ==
Whakakai has been recovered in the same deposits that have also yielded the primitive odontocetes Awamokoa, Austrosqualodon, Otekaikea, and Waipatia, the eomysticetids Matapanui, Tohoraata, Tokarahia, and Waharoa, and the balaenomorphs Mauicetus and Horopeta.
