= Horopeta =

Horopeta Temporal range: Late Oligocene, 27–25 Ma
- Restoration of Horopeta

Scientific classification
- Domain: Eukaryota
- Kingdom: Animalia
- Phylum: Chordata
- Class: Mammalia
- Order: Artiodactyla
- Infraorder: Cetacea
- Family: incertae sedis
- Genus: †Horopeta; Tsai and Fordyce, 2015

Species
- H. umarere Tsai and Fordyce, 2015 (type)

Extinct genus of whales

Horopeta is a genus of baleen whale from the Late Oligocene (Chattian) Kokoamu Greensand of New Zealand.

== Description ==
Horopeta can be distinguished from other balaenomorphs in the following characters: base of frontal sloping moderately from skull midline; parietal considerably exposed at sagittal crest; parietal largely exposed at sagittal crest; unfused and short posterior process of periotic and tympanic bulla; prominent superior process of periotic; presence of elliptical foramen and sigmoidal cavity in tympanic bulla; unfused and short posterior processes of periotic and tympanic bulla; a distinct pedicle plate situated in fovea epitubaria; presence of horizontal cleft, elliptical foramen, and sigmoidal cavity in tympanic bulla.

== Classification ==
Initial cladistic analysis recovered Horopeta as either a basal balaenomorph or a basal cetotheriid, although the describers noted that the juvenile nature of the holotype might influence its cladistic position within Chaeomysticeti. Later cladistic analyses corroborated the placement of Horopeta outside crown Mysticeti.

== Paleobiology ==
Based on the structure of the jaw, Horopeta was one of the earliest chaeomysticetes capable of gulp-feeding as in extant mysticetes. The same deposits that yielded Horopeta have also yielded the primitive odontocetes Awamokoa, Austrosqualodon, Otekaikea, and Waipatia, the eomysticetids Matapanui, Tohoraata, Tokarahia, and Waharoa, and the balaenomorphs Mauicetus and Whakakai.
