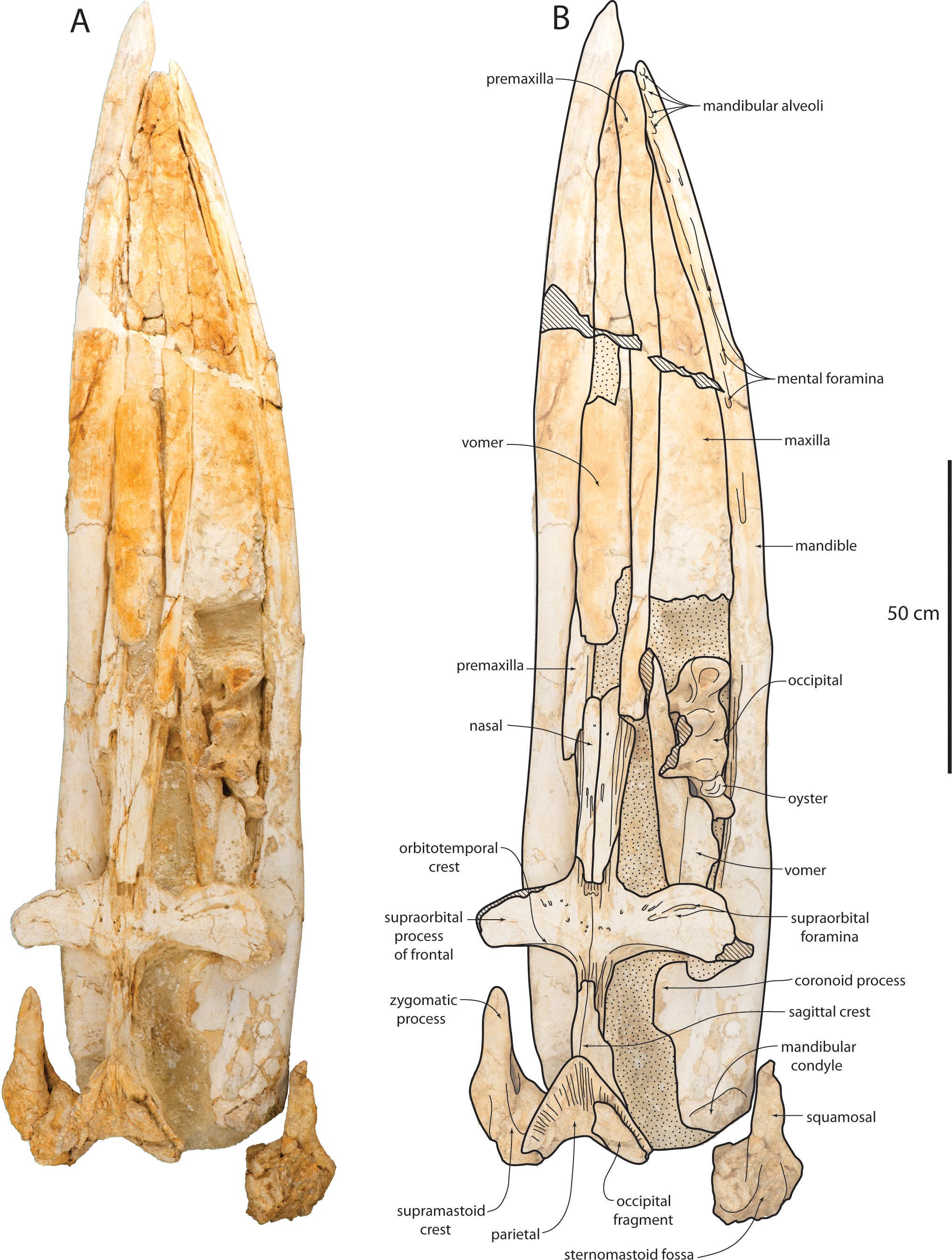
- Holotype skull shown from above

Scientific classification
- Domain: Eukaryota
- Kingdom: Animalia
- Phylum: Chordata
- Class: Mammalia
- Order: Artiodactyla
- Infraorder: Cetacea
- Family: †Eomysticetidae
- Genus: †Waharoa; Boessenecker and Fordyce, 2015
- Species: †W. ruwhenua

Binomial name
- †Waharoa ruwhenua Boessenecker and Fordyce, 2015

= Waharoa (whale) =

Waharoa Temporal range: Late Oligocene, 27.3–25.2 Ma

Extinct species of whale

Waharoa is a genus of eomysticetid baleen whale from the Late Oligocene (Chattian) of New Zealand. It was identified with the discovery of Waharoa ruwhenua by Boessenecker and Fordyce (2015), which added a new genus and species to a monophyletic family Eomysticetidae.

== Description ==
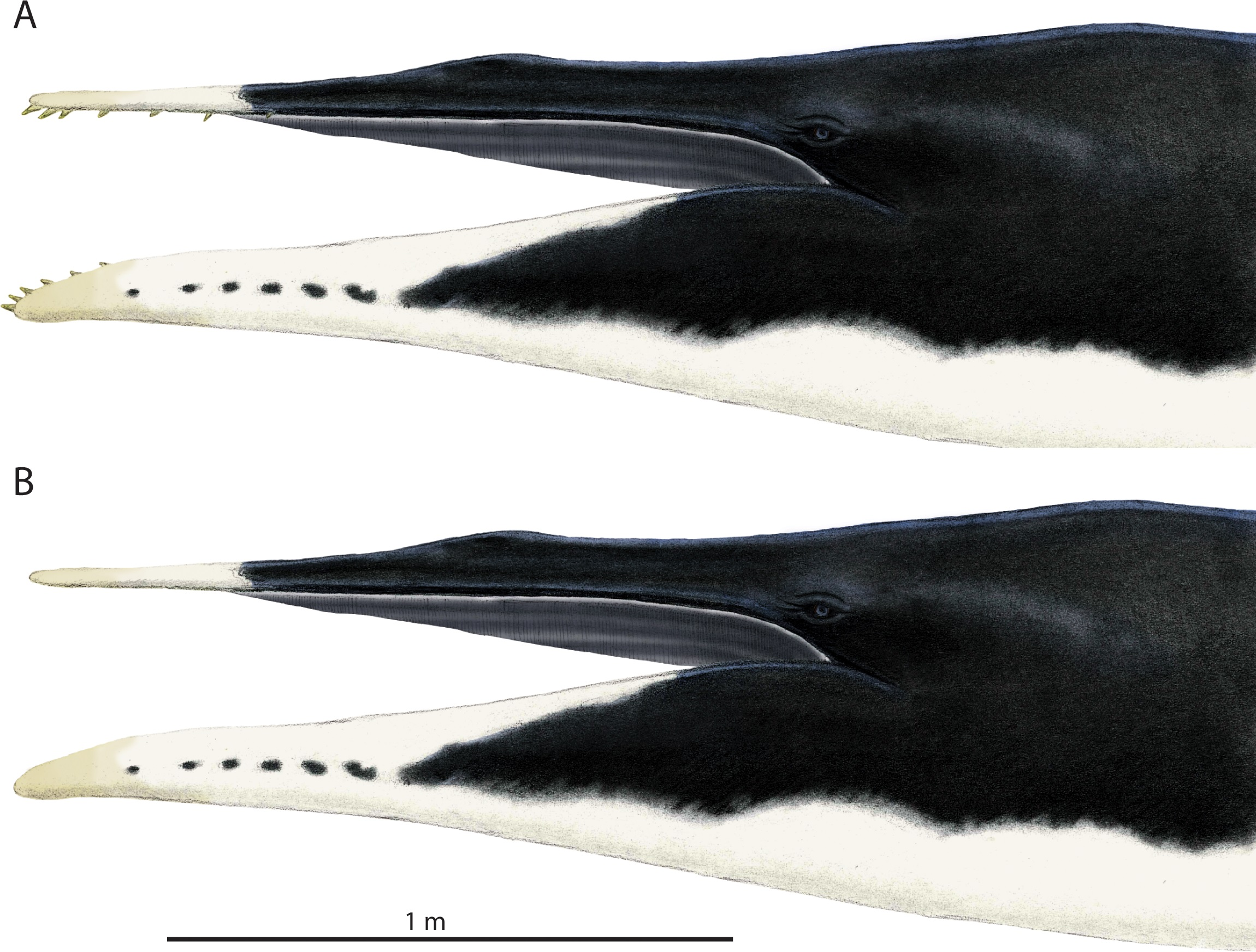
Restorations of Waharoa ruwhenua

Boessenecker and Fordyce (2015) characterize the species as follows: "Waharoa ruwhenua shares Tohoraata and Tokarahia dorsoventrally shallow and wide occipital condyles, a triangular anterior process and well-developed incisural flange of the periotic; with Tohoraata and Tokarahia a concave anterodorsal margin of the anterior process of the periotic and a smooth and transversely convex posterior bullar facet; with Tohoraata a distinct lateral tubercle on the anterior process; and with Eomysticetus and Micromysticetus a short posterior process".

Waharoa ruwhenua had a rostrum that was less flexible than those of modern edentulous mysticetes, yet much more flexible than the rostra of toothed mysticetes. This intermediate flexibility suggests that W. ruwhenua harbored the most primitive form of a kinetic rostrum in the Mysticeti.

== Paleobiology ==
Waharoa ruwhenua had sulci and palatal foramina localized to the posterior half of the palate and lacked these features anteriorly, suggesting that baleen was only present in the posterior palatal regions. The posterior localization of baleen along with a delicate temporomandibular joint with a probable synovial capsule, an anteroposteriorly expanding palate, a non-laterally deflected coronoid process, and a shortage of characteristics indicative of lunge feeding indicate that W. ruwhenua could have utilized skim filter-feeding like modern Balaenidae to feed for zooplankton.

The hypothesis that W. rewhenua was a skim feeder suggests that skim filter-feeding may have been the earliest form of feeding in the edentulous Chaeomysticeti clade.

Based on the enlarged temporal fossae and enlarged mandibular canal, Waharoa was probably incapable of lunge-feeding, although it remains unclear whether it could skim-feed or filter prey in the benthic zone. Waharoa shared its habitat with the odontocetes Awamokoa, Austrosqualodon, Otekaikea, and Waipatia, and the mysticetes Horopeta, Matapanui, Mauicetus, Tohoraata, Tokarahia, and Whakakai.
