= Matapanui =

Matapanui Temporal range: Late Oligocene, 28.1–27.3 Ma

Scientific classification
- Domain: Eukaryota
- Kingdom: Animalia
- Phylum: Chordata
- Class: Mammalia
- Order: Artiodactyla
- Infraorder: Cetacea
- Family: †Eomysticetidae
- Genus: †Matapanui; Boessenecker and Fordyce, 2016
- Species: †M. waihao

Binomial name
- †Matapanui waihao Boessenecker and Fordyce, 2016

Synonyms
- Matapa Boessenecker and Fordyce, 2016 (preoccupied)

Extinct genus of whales

Matapanui is a genus of eomysticetid baleen whale from the Late Oligocene (early Chattian) Kokoamu Greensand of New Zealand.

== Taxonomy ==
Matapanui was originally named Matapa, but that name was already in use for a genus of butterfly, necessitating the name change.

== Paleobiology ==
Based on the enlarged temporal fossae and enlarged mandibular canal, Matapanui was probably incapable of lunge-feeding, although it remains unclear whether it could skim-feed or filter prey in the benthic zone. Waharoa shared its habitat with the odontocetes Awamokoa, Austrosqualodon, Otekaikea, and Waipatia, and the mysticetes Horopeta, Mauicetus, Tohoraata, Tokarahia, Waharoa, and Whakakai.
