= Echericetus =

Echericetus Temporal range: Oligocene

Scientific classification
- Kingdom: Animalia
- Phylum: Chordata
- Class: Mammalia
- Infraclass: Placentalia
- Order: Artiodactyla
- Infraorder: Cetacea
- Family: †Eomysticetidae
- Genus: †Echericetus; Hernández-Cisneros et al., 2023
- Species: †E. novellus

Binomial name
- †Echericetus novellus Hernández-Cisneros et al., 2023

Extinct genus of cetaceans

Echericetus is an extinct genus of eomysticetid cetacean that lived off the coast of what is now Mexico during the Oligocene epoch. A monotypic genus, it contains the species Echericetus novellus.

== Discovery and naming ==
The holotype specimen of Echericetus, MRAHBCS Pal/V119, consists of a partial skull and numerous postcranial elements including vertebrae, ribs and a forelimb. was recovered in 1995 from Oligocene-aged marine deposits south of La Paz, Baja California Sur, Mexico. The holotype was found in bed 2, which represents a lagoonal depositional environment and consists mostly of sandstone and (tuffaceous) mudstone. Aside from this, reworked tuff was also found at the top of bed 2, which was used to radiometrically the layer to 27.95 +- 0.16 Ma, corresponding to the latest Rupelian (late Early Oligocene). This makes these marine beds contemporaneous with the middle San Juan Member of the nearby marine El Cien Formation at least and part of this member at most.

Because the holotype specimen of Echericetus was recovered from lower in the member, it is slightly older than 27.95 Ma. After recovery, the specimen was prepared using both mechanical and chemical methods. It is currently stored in the paleontological collections of the Museo Regional de Antropologiá e Historia de Baja California Sur in Baja California Sur, Mexico (MRAHBCS).

The genus name Echericetus comes from echeri, a word from the local Purepecha language meaning land, earth or ground and cetus, an Ancient Greek word for a large sea creature. The specific name novellus (Latin, meaning youth or new) refers to the mountain complex of Sierra El Novillo, located east of the type locality.

== Classification ==
In the 2024 study describing the animal, Hernández-Cisneros and colleagues conducted a phylogenetic analysis based on a dataset made by Marx and Fordyce in 2015. This analysis recovered Echericetus as a member of Eomysticetidae, an early-diverging clade of chaeomysticetes. Its relationship to other members of the group remains unresolved, forming a polytomy with the other eomysticetid genera Yamatocetus and Micromysticetus. Echericetus is differentiated from the other members of Eomysticetidae through six autapomorphies.
