= El Cien Formation =

Geologic formation in Mexico

- Stratigraphic range: Oligocene-Miocene
- Type: Geologic formation
- Sub-units: Cerro Colorado Mb. San Hilario Mb. Cerro Tierra Blanca Mb.

Location
- Region: Baja California Sur
- Country: Mexico

The El Cien Formation is a geologic formation in eastern Baja California Sur state, Mexico.

Subunits, from younger/higher to older/lower, include the Cerro Colorado Member, San Hilario Member, and Cerro Tierra Blanca Member.

== Fossil content ==
It preserves fossils dating back to the Oligocene epoch of the Paleogene period and Early Miocene epoch of the Neogene period, during the Cenozoic Era.

Color key: Taxon / Reclassified taxon / Taxon falsely reported as present / Dubious taxon or junior synonym / Ichnotaxon / Ootaxon / Morphotaxon	Notes; Uncertain or tentative taxa are in small text; ~~crossed out~~ taxa are discredited.

=== Cetaceans ===
Cetaceans of the El Cien Formation
Genus	Species	Location	Stratigraphic position	Material	Notes	Image
Calafiacetus	C. longipinna	Baja California Sur, Mexico			A chaeomysticete	
Echericetus	E. novellus	Baja California Sur, Mexico			A eomysticetid cetacean	
Kaaucetus	K. thesaurus	Baja California Sur, Mexico			A aetiocetid cetacean	
Niparajacetus	N. palmadentis	Baja California Sur, Mexico			A aetiocetoid cetacean	
Tlaxcallicetus	T. guaycurae	Baja California, Sur, Mexico			A chaeomysticete	

== See also ==
- Cenozoic Mexico
- List of fossiliferous stratigraphic units in Mexico
