= Eomysticetus =

Eomysticetus Temporal range: Chattian

Scientific classification
- Domain: Eukaryota
- Kingdom: Animalia
- Phylum: Chordata
- Class: Mammalia
- Order: Artiodactyla
- Infraorder: Cetacea
- Family: †Eomysticetidae
- Genus: †Eomysticetus; Sanders and Barnes, 2002

Species
- †E. carolinensis Sanders and Barnes, 2002 †E. whitmorei Sanders and Barnes, 2002 (type)

Extinct genus of whales

Eomysticetus is an extinct genus of baleen whale from the late Oligocene (Chattian) Chandler Bridge Formation of South Carolina.

== Taxonomy ==
Eomysticetus is a member of the family Eomysticetidae, which also includes Micromysticetus, Tohoraata, Tokarahia, and Yamatocetus. There are two species of Eomysticetus, E. whitmorei and E. carolinensis, both from the Chandler Bridge Formation of South Carolina.

== Physical characteristics ==
The skull was around 1.5 metres (4.9 ft) in length. Like more evolved baleen whales, its jaws had baleen instead of teeth, meaning that it could filter plankton with its baleen plates. However, primitive baleen whales may have retained enamel coated teeth embedded in the gums, similar to modern sperm whales. Baleen whales, as a group, may be sensitive to low-frequency sounds.

Unlike modern baleen whales, Eomysticetus had a blowhole that was positioned ahead of the eyes, and the characteristics of its vertebrae and flipper bones are akin to those of archaeocetes like Basilosaurus.
