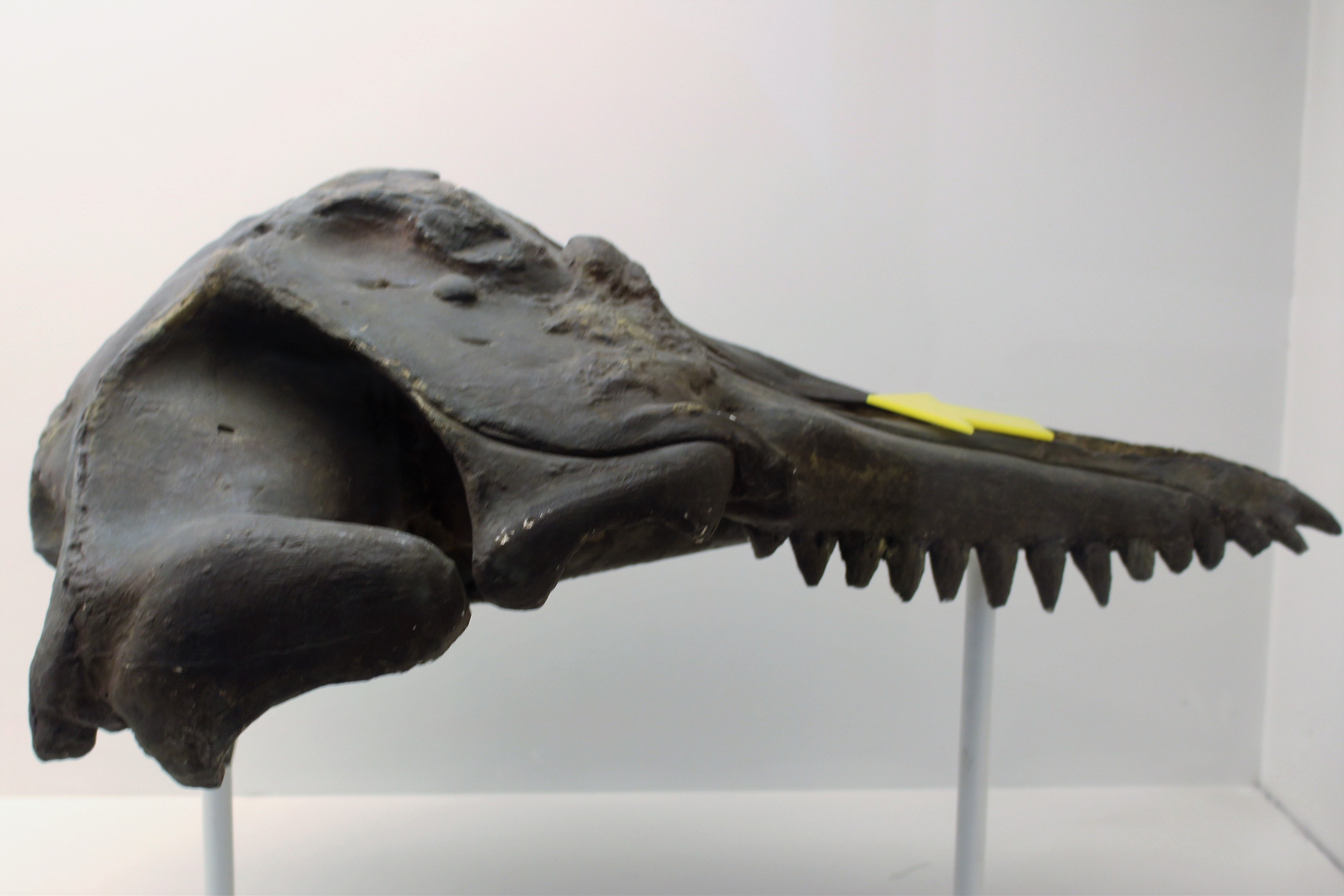
- Skull of P. davidis

Scientific classification
- Kingdom: Animalia
- Phylum: Chordata
- Class: Mammalia
- Order: Artiodactyla
- Infraorder: Cetacea
- Family: †Prosqualodontidae
- Genus: †Prosqualodon; Lydekker, 1894

Species
- P. australis Lydekker, 1894 (type); P. davidis Flynn, 1923; P. hamiltoni Benham, 1937

= Prosqualodon =

Prosqualodon Temporal range: Late Oligocene–Middle Miocene ~28.4–16.0 Ma

Extinct genus of mammals

Prosqualodon is an extinct genus of Early to Middle Miocene cetacean from Argentina, Australia, New Zealand, and Venezuela.

== Description ==
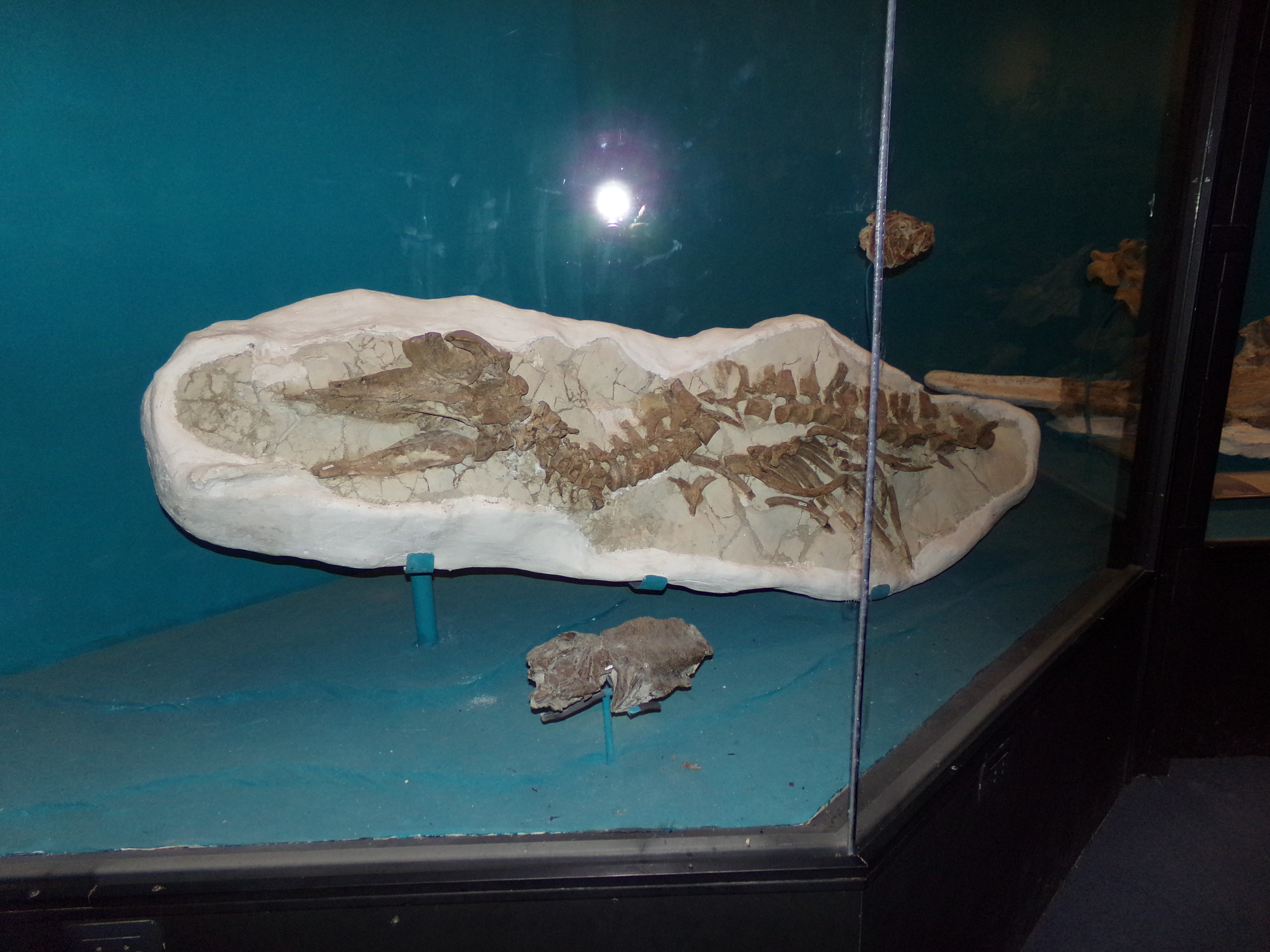
P. australis skeleton

Prosqualodon was related to and looked like modern toothed whales. It was about 2.3 metres (7.5 ft) long and resembled a dolphin. It had long jaws with interlocking teeth that jutted to the outside, remaining visible when the jaws were closed, like those of a gharial. In the back of the mouth it had triangular teeth similar to those of earlier cetaceans, but in most other respects, it was relatively advanced. It had developed the body form of modern whales, with a short neck and simple jaw structure, and like modern cetaceans, it also had a blowhole. The olfactory apparatus was reduced compared with earlier forms, suggesting that it had already lost much of its sense of smell, presumably relying on sound to catch its prey. The species Prosqualodon australis is distinguished by the autapomorphic feature that is its triangular parafalciform fossa.

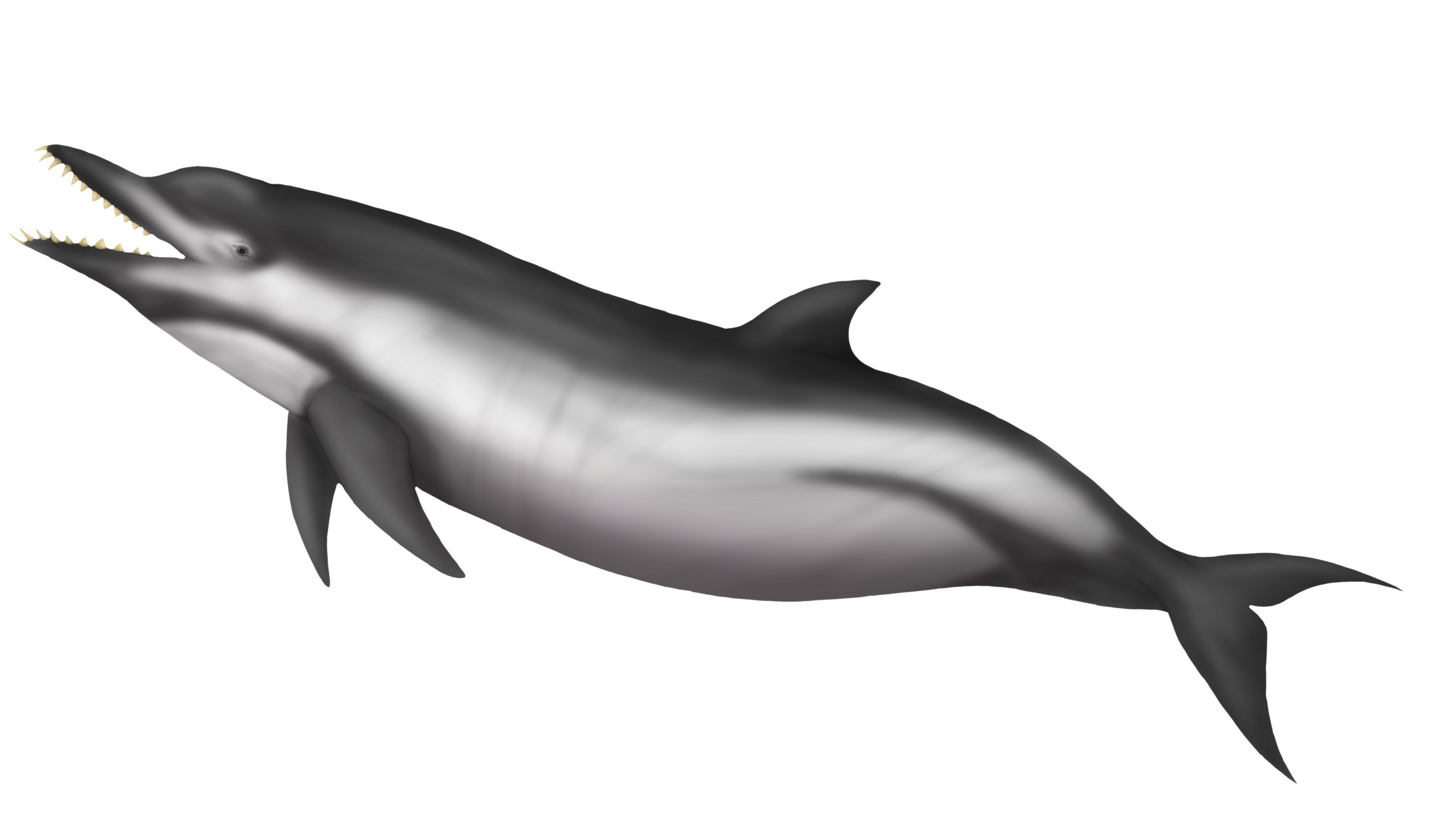
Life reconstruction of P. davidis

== Species ==
- Prosqualodon australis Lydekker, 1894 (type); from the early Miocene (Burdigalian) Castillo Formation of Venezuela and the Gaimán and Monte León Formations of Argentina
- Prosqualodon davidis Flynn, 1923; from the early Miocene (Aquitanian) of Tasmania, Australia
- "Prosqualodon" hamiltoni Benham, 1937; from the late Oligocene (Chattian) of New Zealand; appears to represent distinct genus.

Fossils not assigned to a specific species have also been found in the Calder River Limestone and Jan Juc Formation of Australia.

The nominal species "Prosqualodon" marplesi Dickson, 1964, later treated as a species of the squalodelphinid Notocetus, has been reclassified as a relative of Waipatia and given the new generic name Otekaikea.
