= January–March 2012 in science =

This article lists a number of significant events in science that have occurred in the first quarter of 2012.

== Events ==
=== January ===
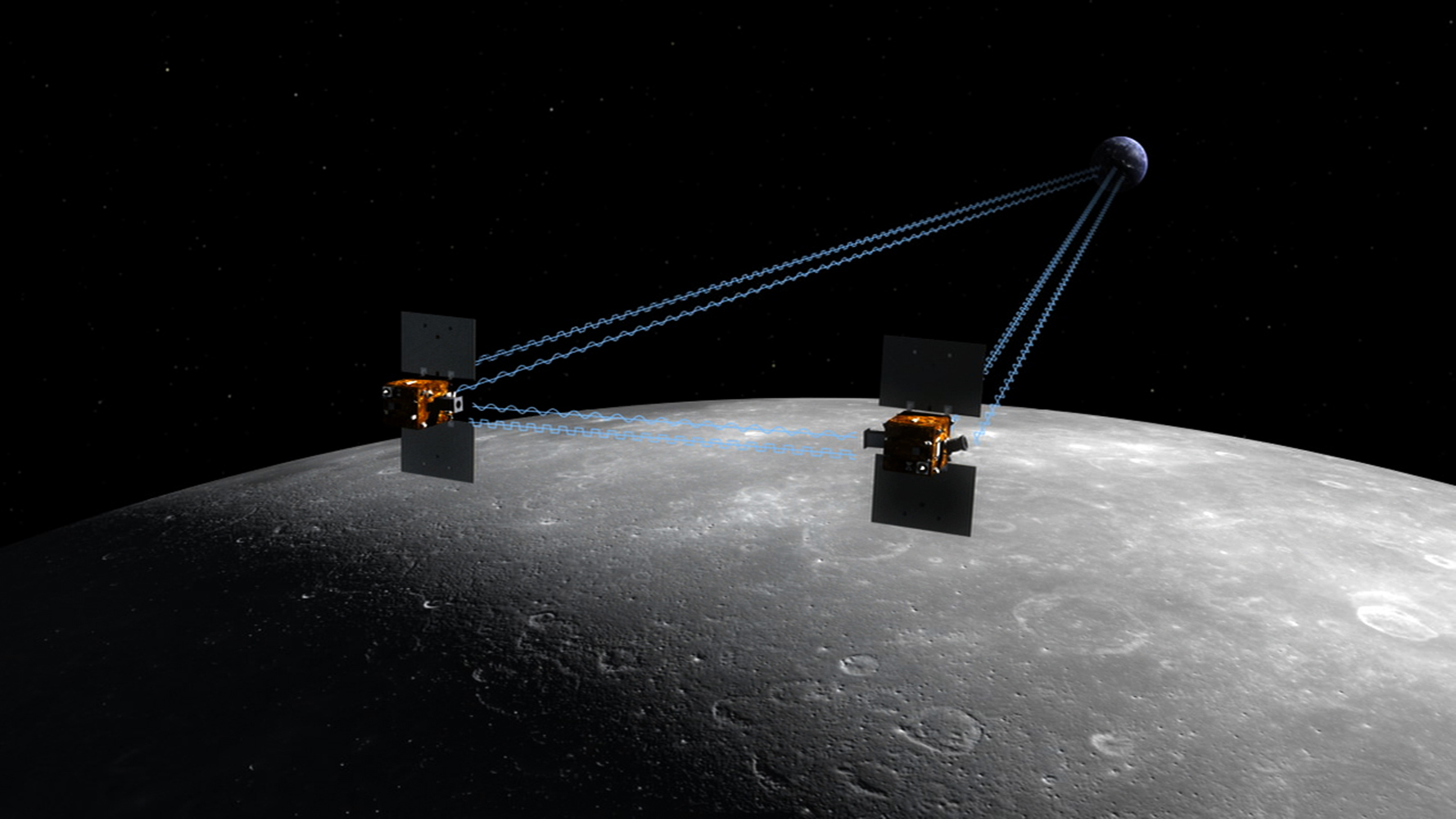
1 January 2012: NASA's twin GRAIL satellites (artist's impression shown) begin studying the Moon's gravitational field.

- 1 January – NASA's GRAIL-B satellite successfully enters lunar orbit, joining its twin spacecraft GRAIL-A. The two satellites will study the Moon's gravitational field, generating a detailed map of its fluctuations to help scientists understand how the Moon formed.
- 2 January
  - China launches its first commercial 3DTV channel, operated by China Central Television (CCTV).
  - A new study shows that deep brain stimulation (DBS) is a safe and effective intervention for treatment-resistant depression in patients with either unipolar major depressive disorder (MDD) or bipolar ll disorder (BP).
- 3 January – Genetically modified fast-ageing mice exhibited improved health and lived two to three times longer than expected after being injected with stem cells, according to findings published in Nature Communications.
- 4 January
  - American scientists report that a parasitic species of fly which compels honey bees to abandon their hives may be responsible for a global honey bee die-off that has decimated hives around the world. Honey bees are crucial pollinators, and their rapidly diminishing population may have severe effects on human agriculture.
  - University of Wyoming scientists develop genetically modified silkworms capable of producing large amounts of spidersilk, which has a greater tensile strength than steel. If available in bulk quantities, the silk could be used to produce high-strength medical sutures and lightweight forms of body armor.
  - Scientists at the University of Southern California develop a method for generating accurate 3D models of cellular genomes.
  - Researchers at Oxford University report promising results in human trials of a prototype hepatitis C vaccine.
  - Scientists at Cornell University use a specialised lens to entirely cloak an object from view for 40 trillionths of a second by altering the speed of light.
  - Classified documents are leaked detailing a range of advanced non-lethal weapons proposed or in development by the United States Armed Forces. Among the systems described are a laser-based weapon designed to divert hostile aircraft, an underwater sonic weapon for incapacitating SCUBA divers and a heat-based weapon designed to compel crowds to disperse.

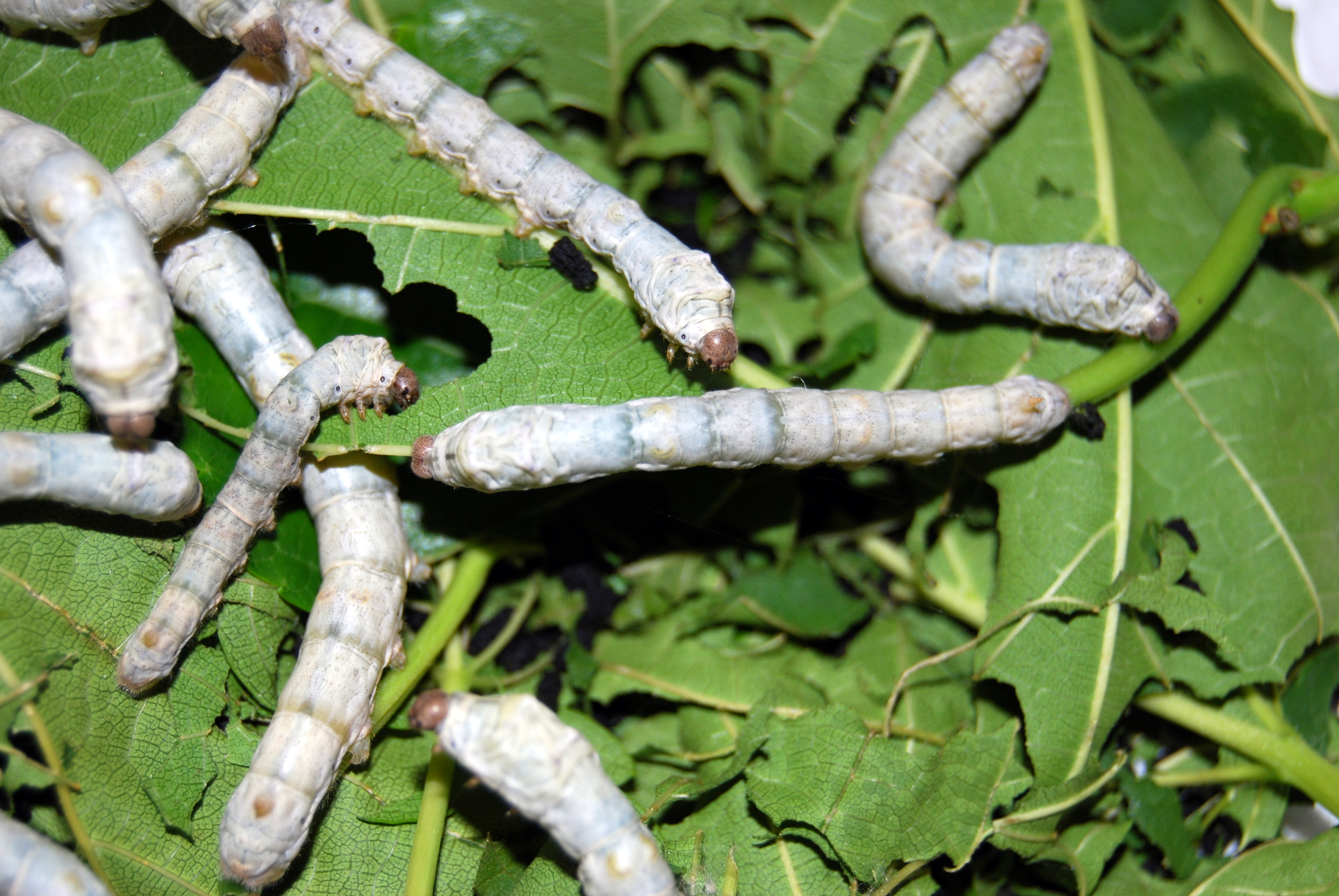
4 January 2012: scientists create genetically engineered silkworms capable of producing bulk quantities of steel-strong spidersilk.

- 5 January
  - Mae Jemison, the first female African-American astronaut, is selected to head the DARPA- and NASA-sponsored 100-Year Starship project, which aims to conduct research into the technological and human elements needed for crewed interstellar travel.
  - American scientists report that they have bred the first-ever monkeys grown from cells taken from different embryos.
  - A team of international researchers reports that low-resistivity electrical wires can be produced at the nanometer scale by chaining phosphorus atoms together and encasing them in silicon. In future, the development may permit the production of efficient nanometer-scale electronics.
  - A team of American, French and Italian researchers demonstrate working transistors made from cotton fibers, doped with gold nanoparticles and a conductive polymer. The invention could permit the creation of a range of electronic-fabric devices, including clothing capable of measuring pollutants, T-shirts that display dynamic information, and carpets that sense how many people are crossing them.
- 6 January
  - The human brain's ability to function can start to deteriorate as early as age 45, according to a study published in the British Medical Journal.
  - Scientists refute a Greenpeace claim that genetically modified corn has caused a new insect pest.

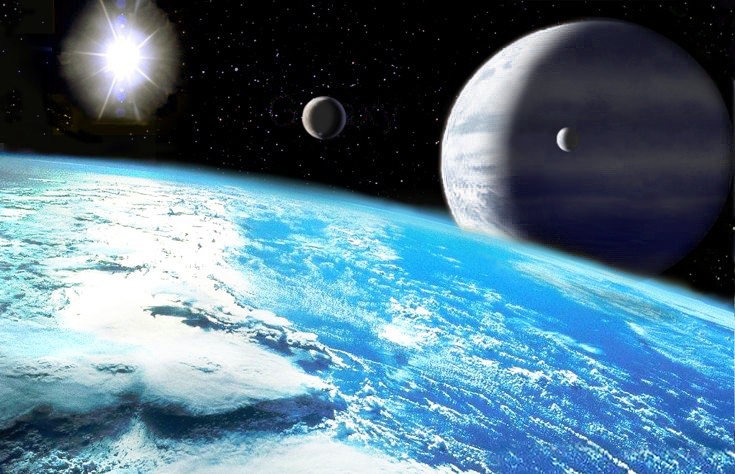
11 January 2012: astronomers report that nearly every star in the Milky Way galaxy may host exoplanets (artist's impression of Upsilon Andromedae d pictured).

- 9 January
  - Human emissions of carbon dioxide will defer the next ice age, according to a new study.
  - Researchers in California develop a cheap plastic capable of removing large amounts of carbon dioxide (CO_{2}) from the air. The new material could enable the development of "artificial trees" that lower atmospheric concentrations of CO_{2} in an effort to lessen the effects of climate change.
- 10 January
  - The 2012 Consumer Electronics Show opens in Las Vegas, Nevada. Among the new products and technologies showcased are large-screen OLED televisions, quad-core tablet computers and consumer-ready 3D printers.
  - Climate change, in the form of reduced snowfall in mountains, is having a major impact on mountainous plant and bird communities, through the increased ability of elk to stay at high elevations over winter and consume plants, according to a study in Nature Climate Change.
- 11 January
  - An international team of astronomers report that each star in the Milky Way Galaxy may host "on average ... at least 1.6 planets", suggesting that over 160 billion star-bound planets may exist in our galaxy alone. The team used gravitational microlensing to discover the gravitational effects of planets orbiting distant stars.
  - American astronomers discover three rocky exoplanets smaller than Earth, the smallest such worlds yet found, orbiting a red dwarf star 130 light-years from Earth.
  - Researchers report the discovery of a natural hormone that has a similar effect to exercise on muscle tissue – burning calories, improving insulin processing, and perhaps boosting strength.
- 12 January
  - Scientists formally describe the world's smallest known vertebrate species, Paedophryne amauensis – a frog that measures just 7 millimeters in length. The species was first discovered in Papua New Guinea in 2009.
  - A University of Connecticut researcher who studied the health benefits of resveratrol, a compound found in red wine, has been found to have falsified data on numerous occasions.

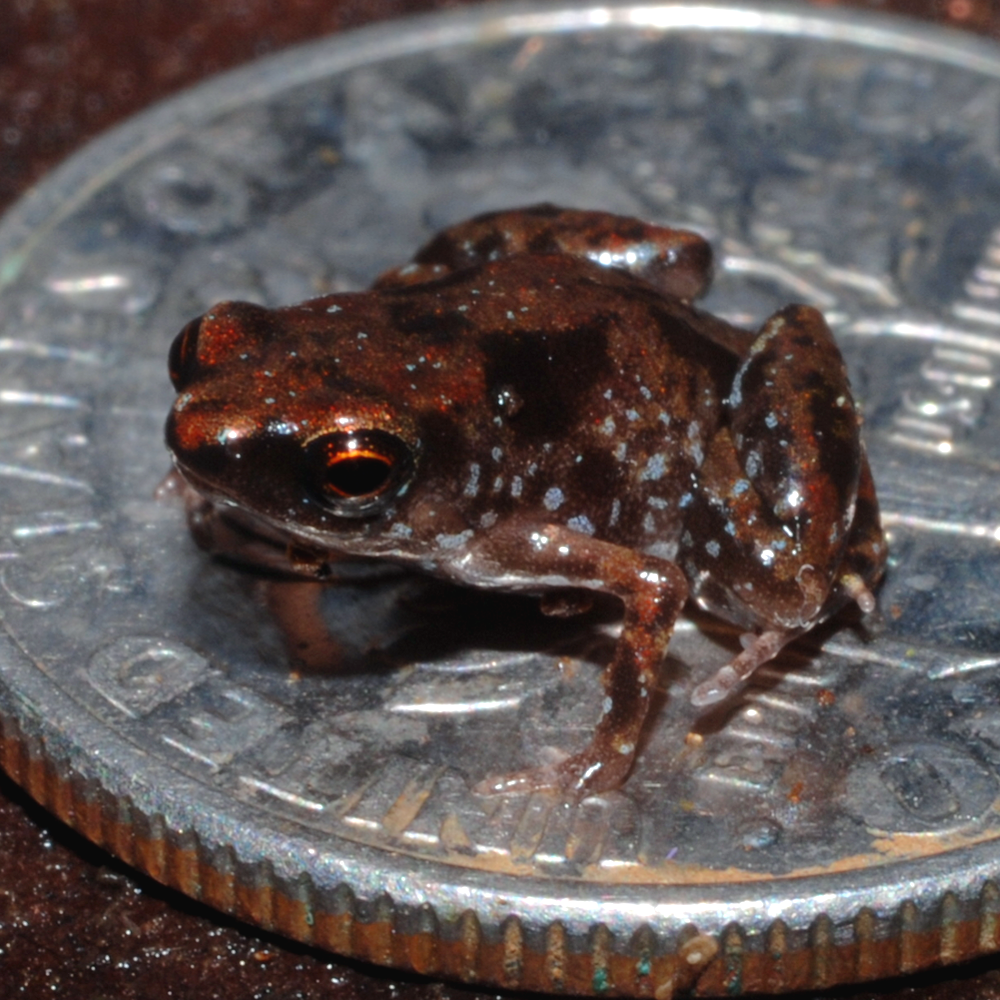
12 January 2012: Paedophryne amauensis, the world's smallest known vertebrate, is formally described.

- 13 January
  - IBM researchers successfully store a single bit of data in a group of just 12 supercooled iron atoms; current commercial hard disks require over 1 million atoms to store one bit of data. The breakthrough, which was achieved with the use of a scanning tunnelling microscope, may permit the production of ultra-high-density computer storage media in future.
  - German scientists convert a gold sphere just 60 nanometres in diameter into an ultra-sensitive listening device, potentially allowing the sounds of bacteria and other single-celled organisms to be recorded.
- 14 January – Researchers at the University of Cambridge repair myelin sheath damage in ageing mice with multiple sclerosis by injecting the blood of younger mice into them, reactivating the older mice's regenerative stem cells.
- 15 January – Russia's Fobos-Grunt Martian sample return spacecraft, which became stranded in orbit after a post-launch malfunction in November 2011, re-enters Earth's atmosphere.
- 18 January
  - Astronomers report the discovery of the most distant dwarf galaxy yet found, approximately 10 billion light-years away.
  - A British amateur astronomer discovers a new Neptune-sized exoplanet, just days after the BBC's Stargazing Live program makes a public appeal for volunteers to assist scientists in the search for potential exoplanets. Over 100,000 volunteers are reportedly taking part in the ongoing search.
  - Archaeologists find a novel tulip-shaped fossil, formally named Siphusauctum gregarium, in the Middle Cambrian Burgess Shale in the Canadian Rockies. The 20-centimetre-long creature reportedly possessed a unique filter feeding system.
  - A working 9-nanometer transistor is developed by IBM engineers, demonstrating that nanotubes could serve as a viable alternative to silicon in future nanoelectronic devices.
- 19 January
  - Austrian researchers develop a quantum computer capable of performing calculations without revealing any of the data involved, using encoded strings of photons designed to appear random. This method of "blind quantum cryptography" may permit sensitive data to be processed and transferred without any danger of interception or decryption, leading to ultra-secure cloud computing.
  - NASA data shows that in 2011, temperatures in the Arctic rose beyond the record established in 2010 – setting a new record.
- 20 January – Virologists agree to a temporarily hiatus on experiments on the H5N1 influenza virus, due to fears that an airborne strain of the lethal virus could be used by bioterrorists.
- 22 January
  - American researchers report that nanoparticles can be successfully engineered to mimic part of the body's immune system, improving its response to vaccines.
  - An international team of scientists concludes that anthropogenic CO_{2} emissions over the last 100 to 200 years have already raised ocean acidity far beyond the range of natural variations.

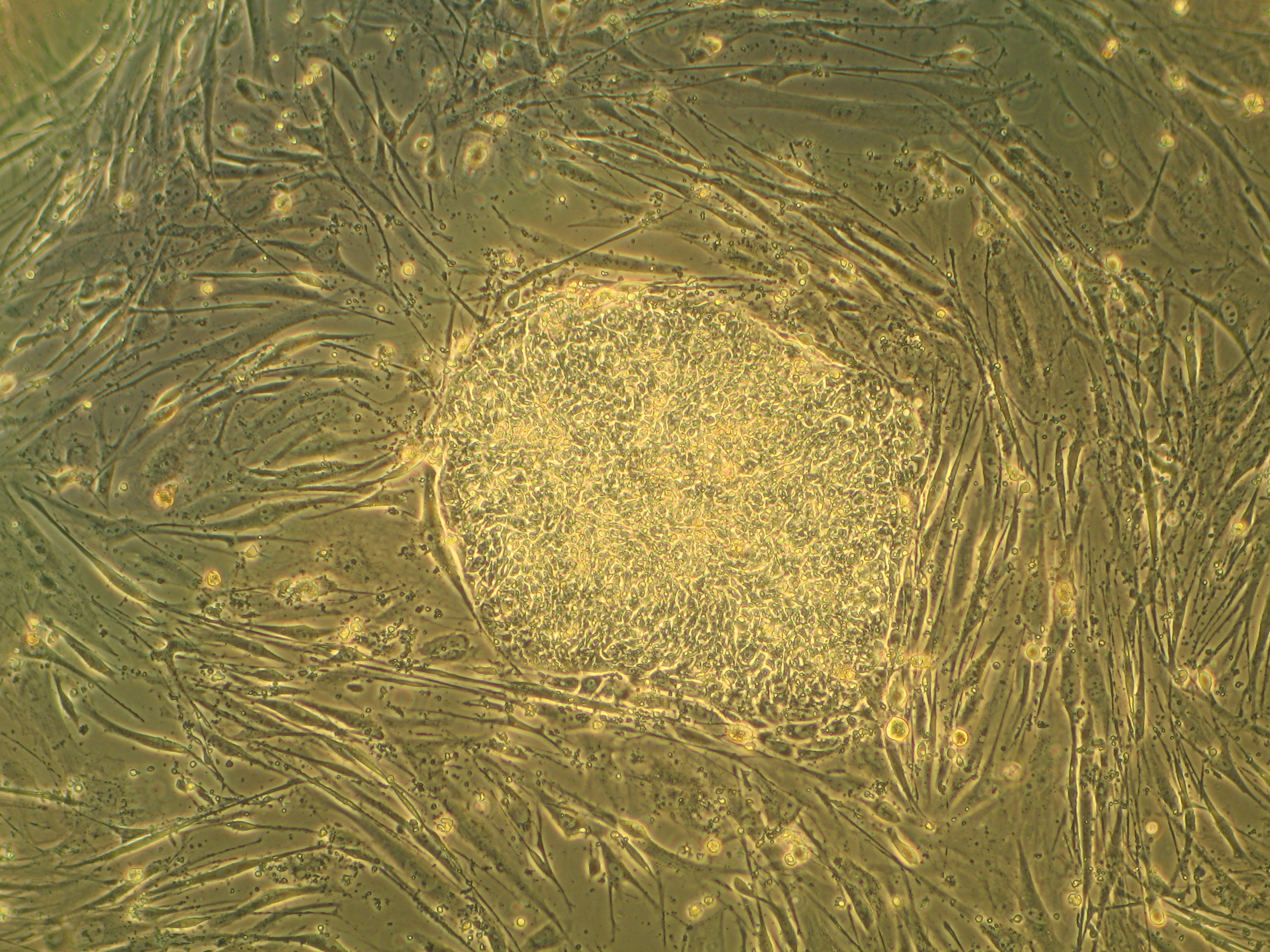
23 January 2012: stem cell therapy is successfully used to ease the symptoms of blindness in human volunteers (human embryonic stem cell shown).

- 23 January
  - South Korean scientists develop touchscreens that can recognise the existence and concentration of DNA molecules placed on them. The invention could allow the development of smartphones with the ability to diagnose users' medical conditions.
  - The Lancet reports that a human medical trial of embryonic stem cells successfully eased a degenerative form of blindness in two volunteers, and showed no signs of any adverse effects.
  - Brain scans of people under the influence of psilocybin, the active ingredient in magic mushrooms, have given scientists the most detailed picture to date of how psychedelic drugs work.
- 24 January
  - Earth is struck by the largest solar storm since 2005, creating huge aurorae and potentially interfering with satellite communications worldwide.
  - A nest of dinosaur eggs 100 million years older than the previous oldest site is found in South Africa. The fossils are of the prosauropod species Massospondylus, a relative of the long-necked sauropods.
- 25 January
  - University of Washington scientists report that injecting sulfate particles into the stratosphere will not fully offset climate change.
  - A study in Japan finds that green tea can significantly reduce disability in the elderly, likely due to its antioxidant content.
- 26 January – American researchers successfully "cloak" a three-dimensional object, making it invisible from all angles, for the first time. However, the demonstration works only for waves in the microwave region of the electromagnetic spectrum.

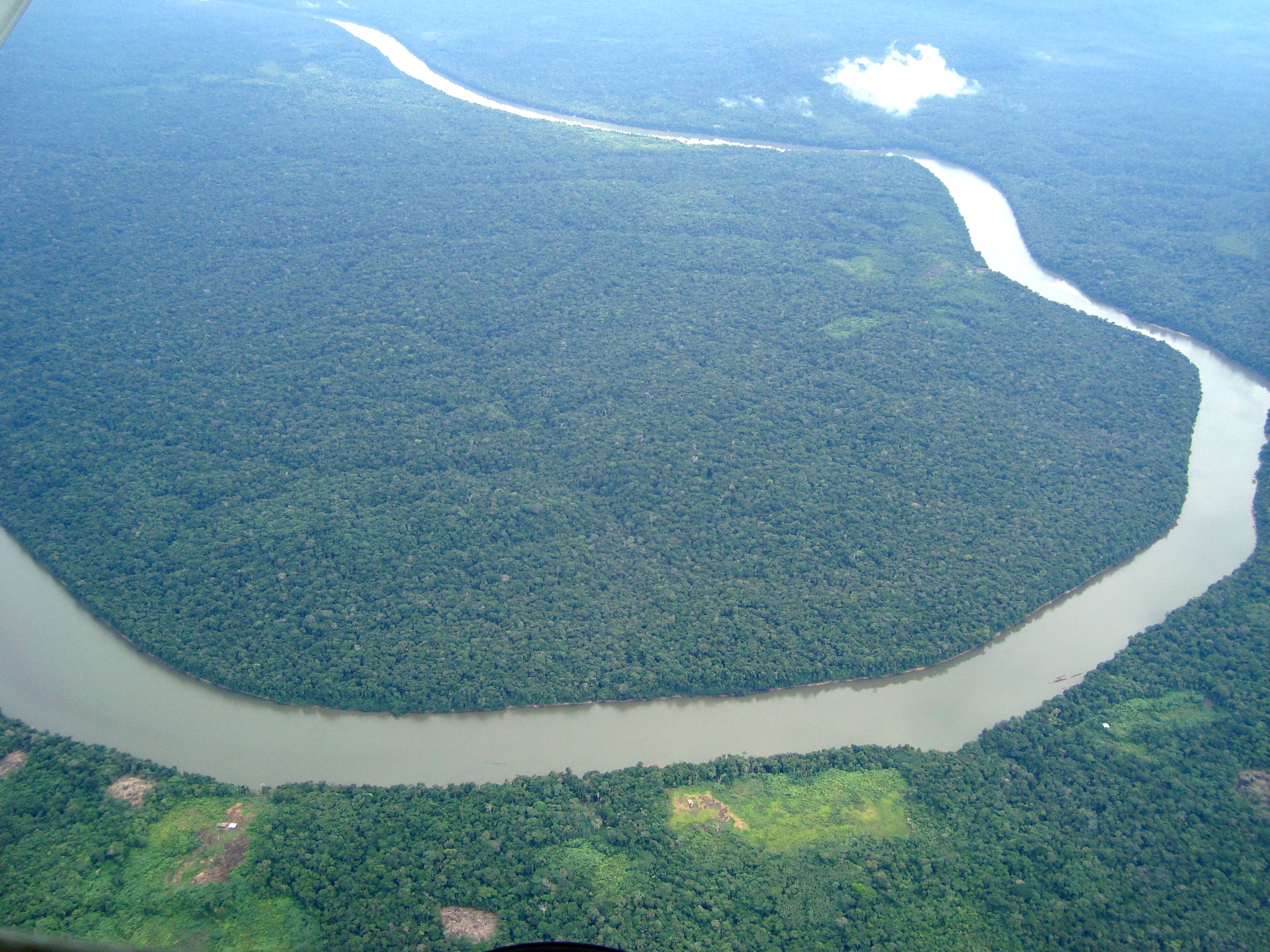
27 January 2012: the most detailed 3D image of the Amazon rainforest yet produced is published.

- 27 January
  - An international team of scientists reports that graphene, already widely known for its conductive properties, is also able to selectively filter gases and liquids. The material could thus potentially find use in industrial distillation and water purification.
  - A study published in the journal Carcinogenesis shows that in both cell lines and mouse models, grape seed extract (GSE) kills head and neck cancer cells, while leaving healthy cells unharmed.
  - Using an airborne LIDAR system, scientists produce the most detailed 3D image of the Amazon rainforest yet recorded, allowing the accurate measurement of the rainforest's ecosystem and rate of deforestation.
  - 2012 BX_{34}, an asteroid between 8 and 11 metres (26 and 36 ft) across, passes within 60,000 kilometres of the Earth, performing one of the closest asteroid flybys yet recorded.
  - British animators develop a new algorithmic method of creating highly realistic CGI trees, allowing films and video games to easily display realistic 3D foliage.
- 29 January – Using stem cells generated from patients with schizophrenia, bipolar depression and other mental illnesses, scientists at the University of Edinburgh create neurones with brain tissue genetically identical to the person's brain. The breakthrough could allow new treatments for mental illnesses to be accurately tested without endangering patients.
- 30 January
  - A United Nations report warns that time is running out to ensure there is enough food, water and energy for a rapidly rising world population. By 2030, the world will need at least 50 percent more food, 45 percent more energy and 30 percent more water, according to estimates.
  - The British Royal Navy begins development of a new anti-missile defence system, the Sea Ceptor, capable of intercepting and destroying supersonic missiles within an area of 500 square miles (1,300 km^{2}). The system is likely to enter service by 2017.
  - American researchers report that ultrasound waves can be used effectively to kill sperm, potentially offering a new male contraceptive method.
  - Ozone from anthropogenic air pollution in North America leads to the annual loss of 1.2 million tonnes of wheat in Europe alone, according to a study published by British universities.
  - A NASA study reports that changes in solar activity cannot be responsible for the current period of global warming. The sun's total solar irradiance has in recent years dipped to the lowest levels recorded during the satellite era.
  - According to genetic studies, modern humans seem to have mated with "at least two groups" of ancient humans: Neanderthals and Denisovans.

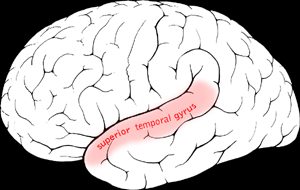
31 January 2012: American scientists demonstrate a method of decoding human thoughts by studying the superior temporal gyrus (indicated).

- 31 January
  - American scientists successfully demonstrate a method of decoding thoughts by studying activity in the human brain's superior temporal gyrus, which is involved in linguistic processing. Using this method, a device which reads and transmits the thoughts of brain-damaged patients could become a reality in the future.
  - Microchip designer AMD launches its Radeon HD 7950 graphics card, based on a 28 nanometer manufacturing process – a more advanced die shrink of the current 32 nanometer standard.
  - Poyang Lake, China's largest freshwater lake, has almost completely dried up due to a combination of severe drought and the impact of the recently built Three Gorges Dam.

=== February ===
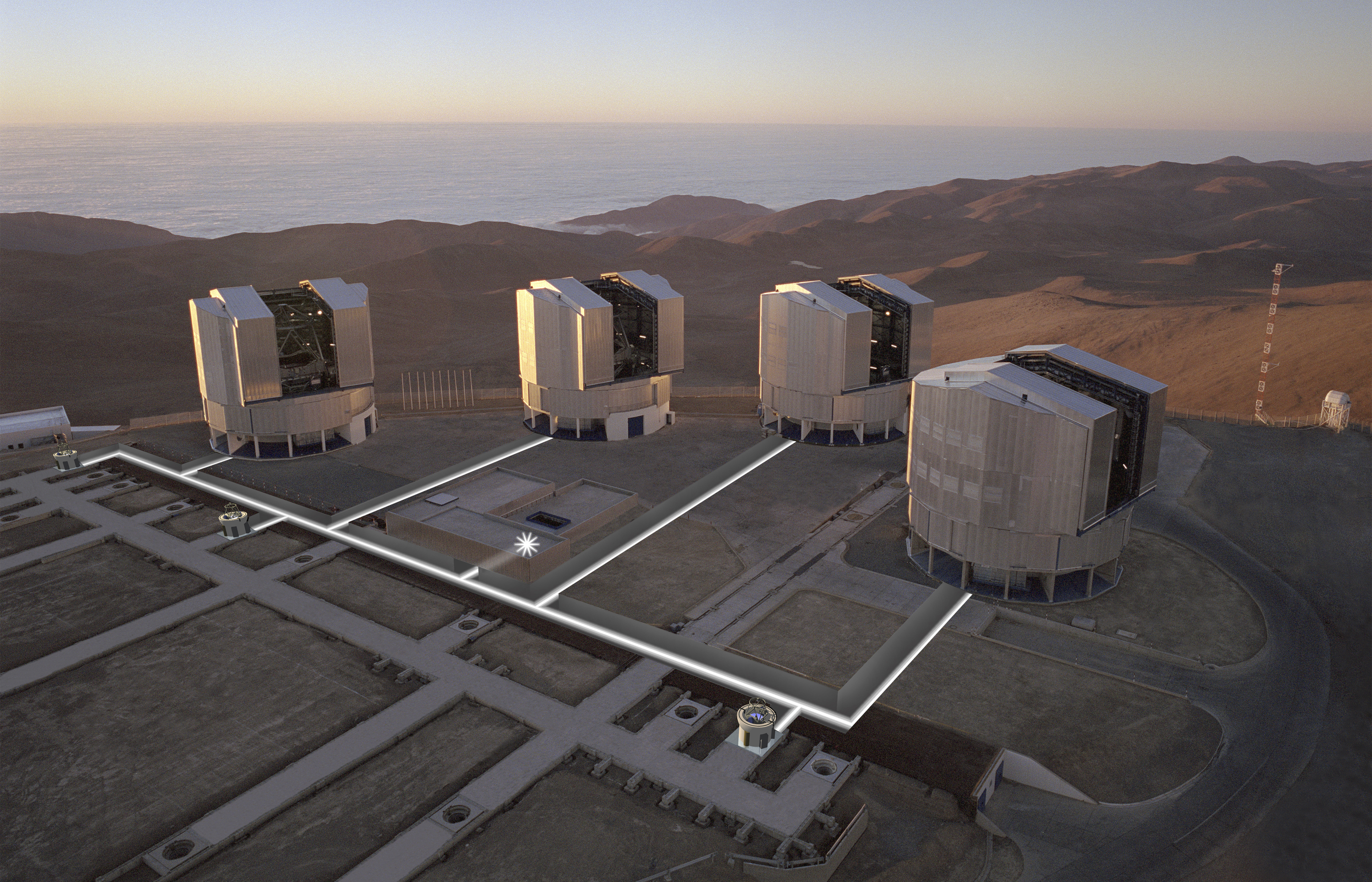
3 February 2012: the Very Large Telescope array enters operation in northern Chile.

- 1 February – Researchers report that the eruption of supervolcanoes could be predicted several decades before the event by detecting the seismic and chemical signs of a massive magma buildup.
- 2 February
  - The European Commission issues a 225-million-euro (US$330 million) contract to an Anglo-German consortium for eight additional satellites to expand Europe's Galileo satellite navigation system.
  - Astronomers report the discovery of a large exoplanet orbiting within the habitable zone of a star 22 light-years distant. This is the fourth potentially life-supporting exoplanet discovered since May 2011.
  - Researchers reportedly create the world's thinnest pane of glass, a sheet of silicon and oxygen just three atoms wide. The glass formed in an accidental reaction when the scientists were synthesizing graphene on copper-covered quartz.
- 3 February
  - The European Southern Observatory successfully activates its Very Large Telescope (VLT) by linking four existing optical telescopes to operate as a single device. The linked VLT is the largest optical telescope yet built, with a combined mirror diameter of 130 metres (430 ft).
  - Physicists at Germany's Max Planck Institute unveil a microscope that can image living brain cells as they function inside a living animal.
  - American scientists demonstrate a medical procedure that may allow patients with nerve damage to recover within weeks, rather than months or years. The procedure makes use of a cellular mechanism similar to that which repairs nerve axons in invertebrates.
  - MIT researchers develop high-temperature photonic crystals capable of efficiently converting heat to electricity, potentially allowing the creation of pocket-sized microreactors with ten times the efficiency and lifespan of current commercial batteries. As photonic crystals are already a relatively mature technology, the new invention could be commercialised in as little as two years.
  - A Lancet study reports that global malaria deaths may be badly underestimated, giving a revised 2010 malaria death toll of 1.24 million. By contrast, the World Health Organization estimated that 655,000 people died of malaria in 2010.
- 4 February – Dutch doctors successfully fit an 83-year-old woman with an artificial jaw made using a 3D printer. This operation, the first of its kind, could herald a new era of accurate, patient-tailored artificial transplants.

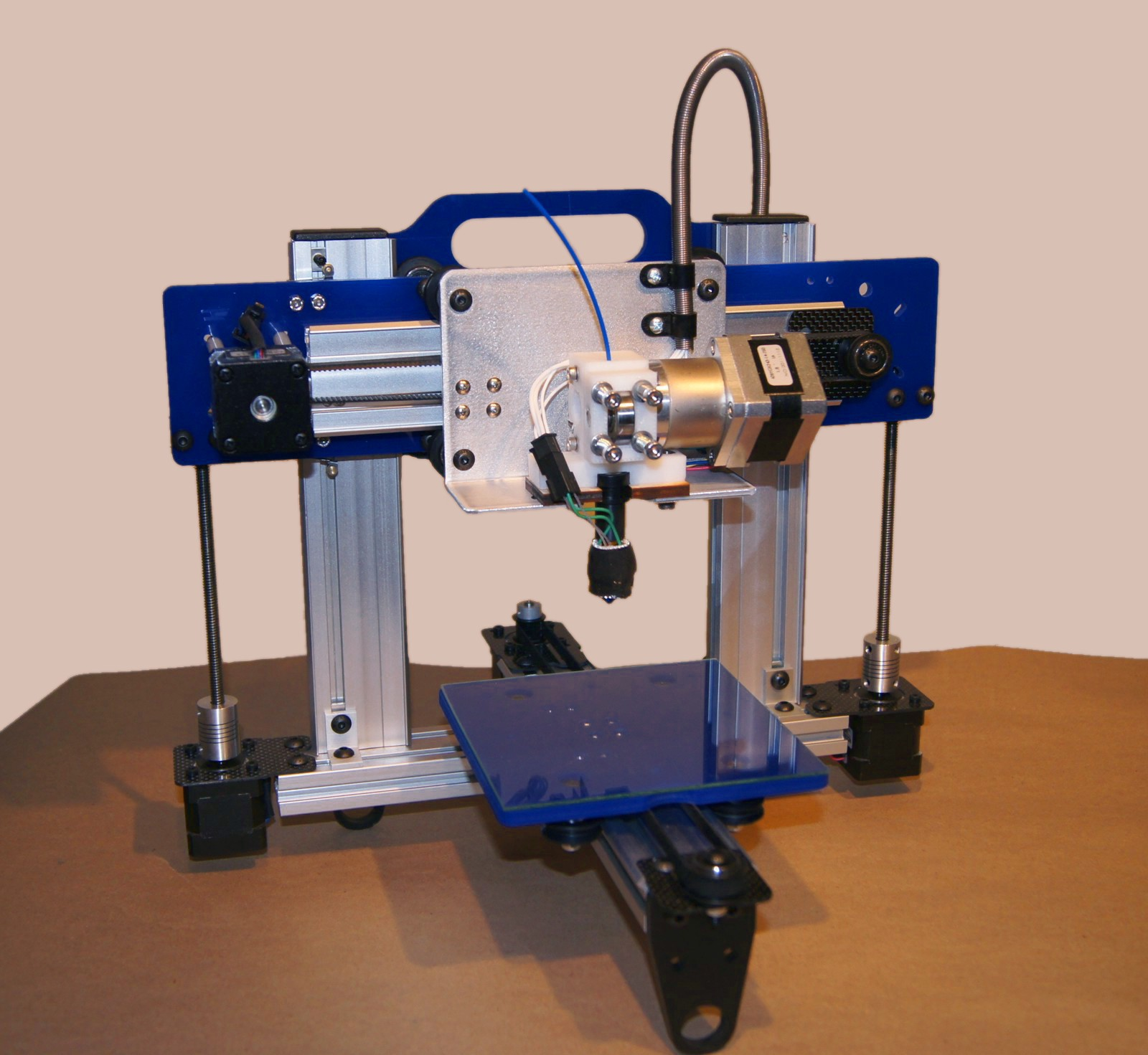
4 February 2012: Dutch doctors successfully fit the first artificial jaw made with a 3D printer (ORDbot Quantum 3D printer pictured).

- 6 February
  - After nearly 20 years of intermittent drilling, Russian scientists reportedly break through to the surface of the subterranean Lake Vostok, buried 2.5 miles (4.0 km) under the Antarctic ice. The lake, which has not been uncovered for over 15 million years, may harbour a unique prehistoric ecosystem.
  - A team of engineers and biologists develop a working WORM computer memory out of salmon DNA molecules by combining the DNA with silver nanoparticles.
- 7 February
  - Scientists report that rapid declines in some British and European ladybird species are being caused by the spread of the invasive harlequin species.
  - The entire genome of an extinct species of human – the 40,000-year-old Denisova hominin – has been decoded from a fossil.
- 8 February – NASA data reveals that the total land ice lost from Greenland, Antarctica and Earth's glaciers and ice caps between 2003 and 2010 totalled about 4.3 trillion tons (1,000 cubic miles), adding about 0.5 inches (13 millimeters) to global sea levels. Such a quantity of ice would be sufficient to cover the entire United States to a depth of 1.5 feet (0.46 meters).
- 9 February – Researchers at Case Western Reserve University discover that bexarotene, a drug normally used to treat skin cancer, can quickly reverse the symptoms of Alzheimer's disease in mice, removing over 50% of the disease's trademark amyloid plaque from the brain within 72 hours.
- 10 February – Scientists at the University of California, San Diego report the creation of the tiniest telecommunications laser yet built, just 200 nanometers wide. The highly efficient nanolaser could be used to develop optical computers and ultra-high-resolution imaging systems.
- 13 February
  - A new UN report warns that 24 percent of global land area has declined in productivity over the past 25 years due to unsustainable land-use, and soil erosion rates are about 100 times greater than nature can replenish.
  - The European Space Agency successfully conducts the maiden launch of its new Vega rocket, transporting several satellites into orbit, including the first Polish, Hungarian and Romanian satellites.
  - BAE Systems engineers unveil a carbon-fiber-based structural battery capable of being integrated into a device's framework, reducing weight while maintaining structural strength and power capacity.
- 14 February – In a groundbreaking human trial, American scientists report that damaged heart tissue in heart attack patients can be repaired with infusions of the patient's own stem cells. The treatment halved the amount of extant scar tissue within a year.

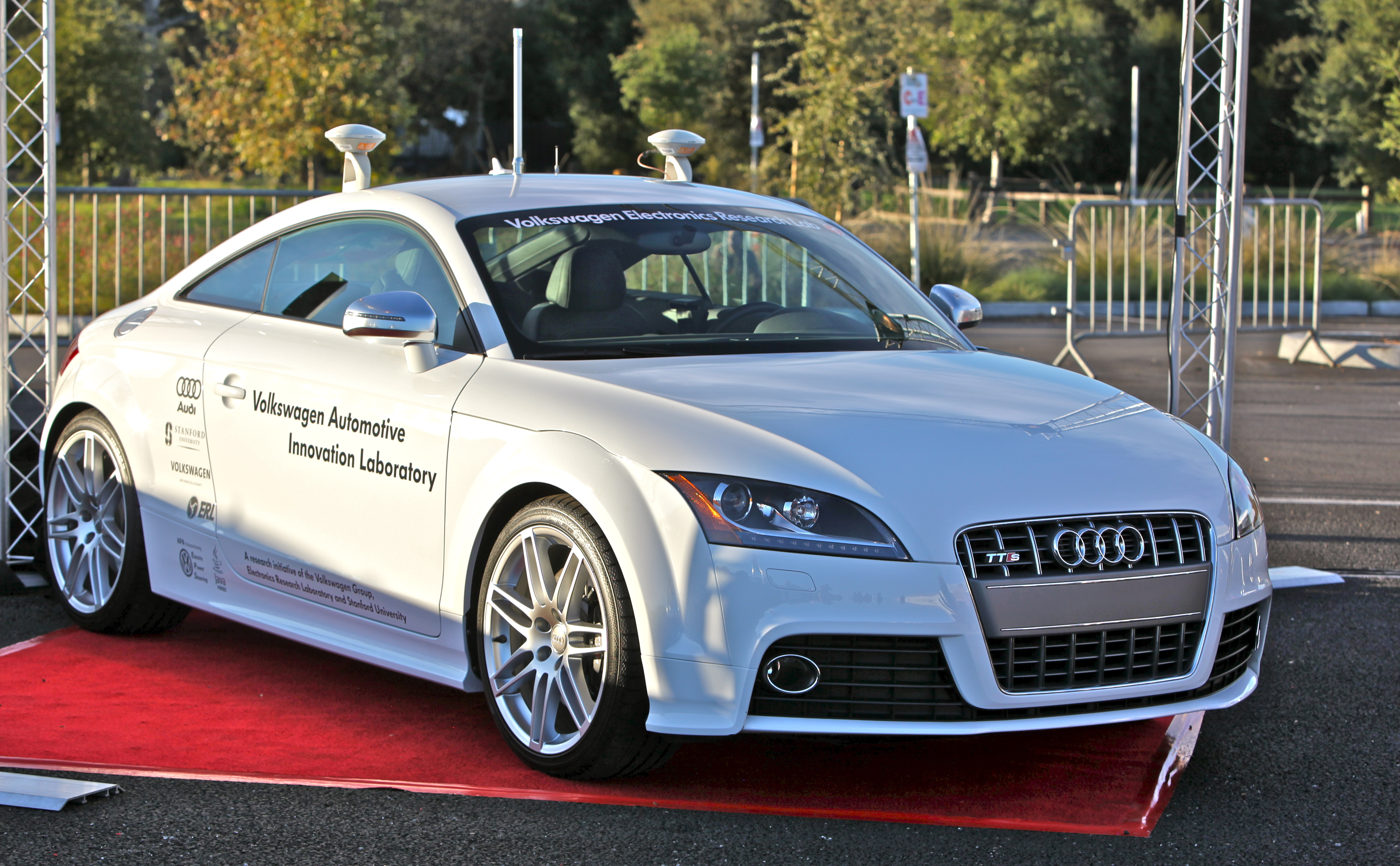
15 February 2012: Nevada becomes the first US state to release official regulations for the public testing of autonomous cars (prototype autonomous Audi pictured).

- 15 February – Nevada becomes the first US state to allow the testing of autonomous vehicles on US public roadways.
- 16 February – The speed at which someone walks may predict their likelihood of developing dementia later in life, according to researchers in the US.
- 20 February – Scientists report regenerating Silene stenophylla from 32,000-year-old remains. This surpasses the previous record of 2,000 years for the oldest material used to regenerate a plant.
- 22 February
  - Scientists have extended the life of male mice by 15%, using an enzyme called SIRT6.
  - Engineers at Stanford University reveal a wirelessly powered, self-propelled medical device that can travel through the bloodstream to deliver drugs, perform diagnostics or microsurgeries.
  - NASA reports the detection of the solid form of buckyballs (buckminsterfullerene) in deep space.
  - Researchers show that sirtuin, a class of proteins, is directly linked to longevity in mammals.
- 24 February – British-Italian researchers demonstrate a giant 3D printer capable of constructing a full-sized house in a single 24-hour session. The machine, which uses sand and a chemical binder as its working material, prints structures from the ground up, including stairs, partition walls and even piping cavities.
- 26 February
  - Researchers publish the first images of the charge distribution in a single molecule, precisely showing the motion of electrons. The observed distribution apparently corresponds closely with predictive models.
  - It may be possible to one day create an "unlimited" supply of human eggs to aid fertility treatment, US doctors say.
- 27 February
  - The remains of two new species of prehistoric penguin are discovered – Kairuku grebneffi and Kairuku waitaki. Standing nearly 5 feet (1.5 m) tall, Kairuku grebneffi is the largest penguin ever discovered.
- 28 February
  - IBM announces a breakthrough in quantum computing, demonstrating a qubit microchip that can preserve its quantum states up to four times longer than previous designs.
  - Researchers estimate that Tyrannosaurus rex's bite force could exceed 57,000 newtons, more than three times that of a great white shark.
- 29 February – Raspberry Pi single-board computer is commercially launched through U.K. online retailers.

=== March ===
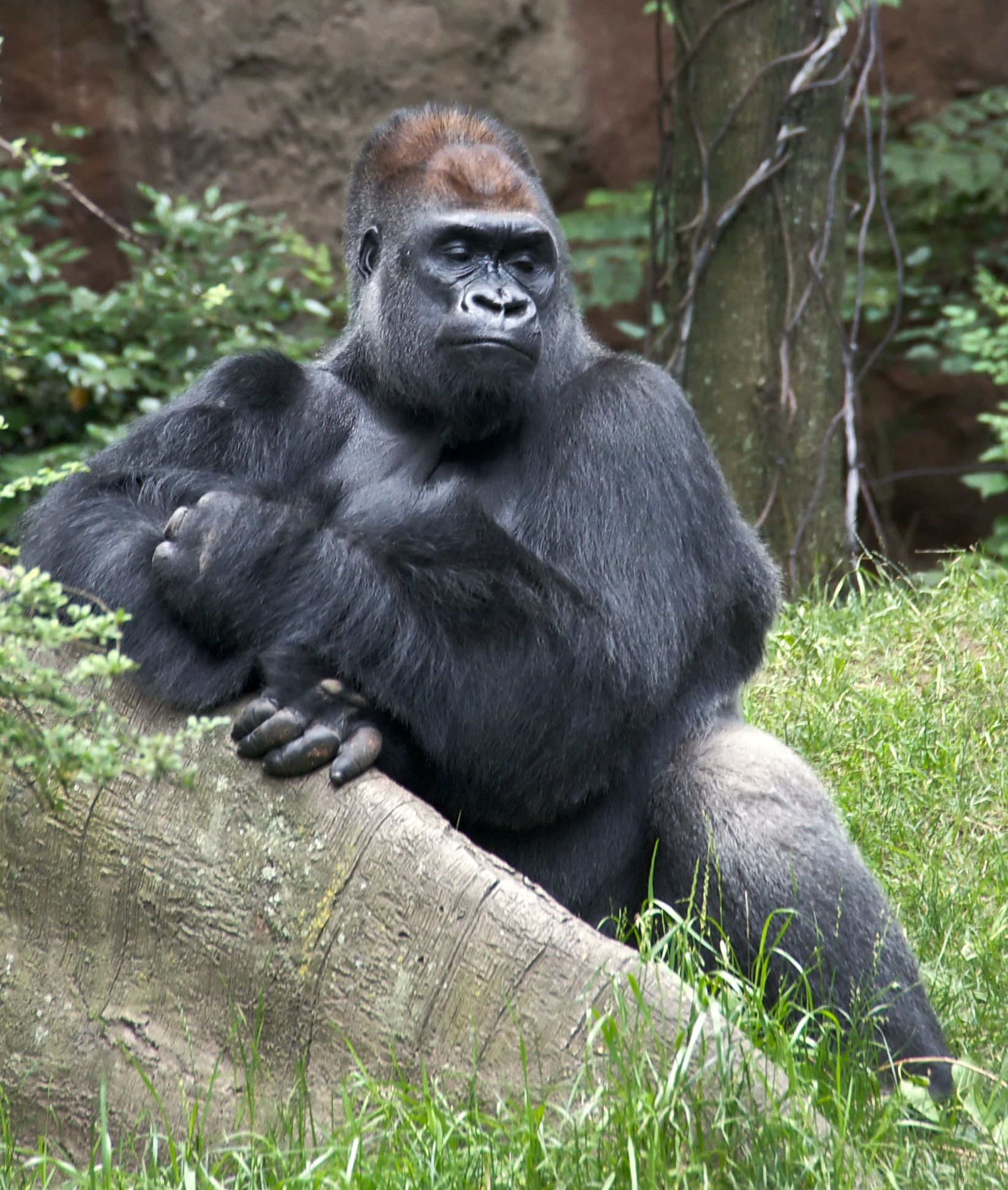
7 March 2012: scientists sequence the genome of the western gorilla.

- 1 March – New research concludes that the Earth's oceans may be growing more acidic at a faster rate than at any time in the past 300 million years.
- 2 March
  - NASA's Cassini spacecraft detects oxygen in the atmosphere of Saturn's moon Dione.
  - Meta-analysis of 42 previous studies concludes that some consumption of chocolate may be good for the heart.
- 5 March – A study finds a correlation between snoring as a toddler and behavior problems later in childhood.
- 7 March
  - Physicists from Fermi National Accelerator Laboratory report data suggesting that the elusive hypothesized Higgs boson ("God particle", with a mass of 115 to 135 GeV/c^{2}) may have been detected.
  - Scientists successfully decode the gorilla genome, the last of the great ape genera to be sequenced.
- 8 March
  - A study suggests that donor stem cells may prevent organ rejection in imperfectly matched transplant cases.
  - The international Daya Bay neutrino experiment announces the discovery of a new type of neutrino oscillation.
- 9 March – US researchers announce a breakthrough in treating AIDS, using a cancer drug to attack HIV inside certain immune-system cells, which were previously difficult to reach with treatments.
- 12 March
  - Researchers at the Vienna University of Technology develop a 3D printer that can print at the nano-scale and is orders of magnitude faster than previous devices.
  - A diet high in red meat can shorten life expectancy by increasing the risk of death from cancer and heart problems, according to a study of more than 120,000 people by researchers at Harvard Medical School. Substituting red meat with fish, chicken or nuts lowered the risks, the study found.
- 13 March
  - A California-based company has developed solar panels that are half the price of today's cheapest cells, and therefore cheap enough to challenge fossil fuels.
  - Scientists have identified a potential drug that speeds up trash removal from the cell's recycling center, the lysosome, one of the causes of aging and degenerative diseases.

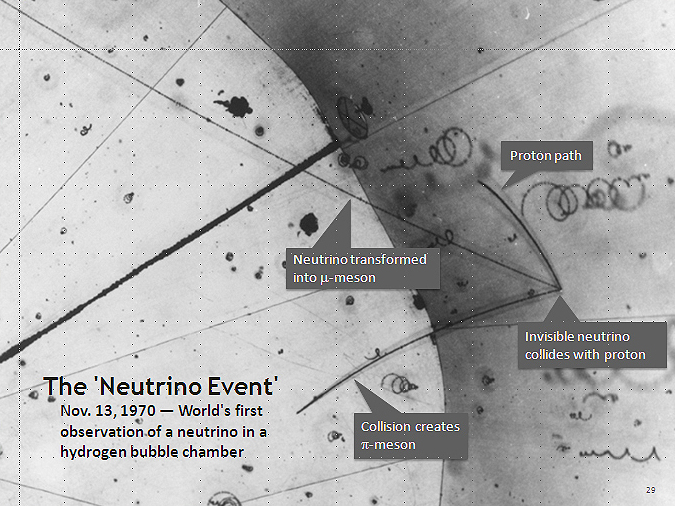
15 March 2012: scientists send the first coherent message using neutrinos (first recorded neutrino event pictured).

- 14 March
  - A fly species, kept in complete darkness for 57 years (1,400 generations), showed genetic alterations that occurred as a result of environmental conditions, offering clear evidence of evolution.
  - A pill which doubles the length of time that patients with advanced skin cancer can survive has gone on sale in Britain for the first time.
  - America's coastlines are even more vulnerable to sea level rise than previously thought, according to a pair of new studies. Up to 32% more real estate could be affected by a 1-meter rise in sea level, while the population exposed to rising water is 87% higher than previously estimated.
  - A process to "unprint" toner ink from paper has been developed by engineers at the University of Cambridge, using short laser pulses to erase words and images.
- 15 March – American scientists use a particle accelerator to send a coherent neutrino message through 780 feet of rock. This marks the first use of neutrinos for communication, and future research may permit binary neutrino messages to be sent immense distances through even the densest materials, such as the Earth's core.
- 16 March – Physicists found no discernible difference between the speed of a neutrino and the speed of light in latest test of the faster-than-light neutrino anomaly.
- 18 March
  - Researchers have identified why a mutation in a particular gene can lead to obesity.
  - NEC has developed "organic radical battery" (ORB) technology with a thickness of just 0.3mm.
- 19 March
  - Even if humankind manages to limit global warming to 2 °C (36 °F), as the Intergovernmental Panel on Climate Change recommends, future generations will have to deal with sea levels 12 to 22 meters (39 to 72 ft) higher than at present, according to research published in the journal Geology.
  - Researchers at the RIKEN Advanced Science Institute (Japan) have developed a way to create full-color holograms with the aid of surface plasmons.
  - The amount of photovoltaic solar panels installed in the US more than doubled from 2010 to 2011, according to a report by the Solar Energy Industries Association (SEIA) and GTM Research.
  - Seagate claims it has paved the way for 3.5-inch hard drives with 60 TB capacities, after breaking the 1 TB/square inch density threshold.

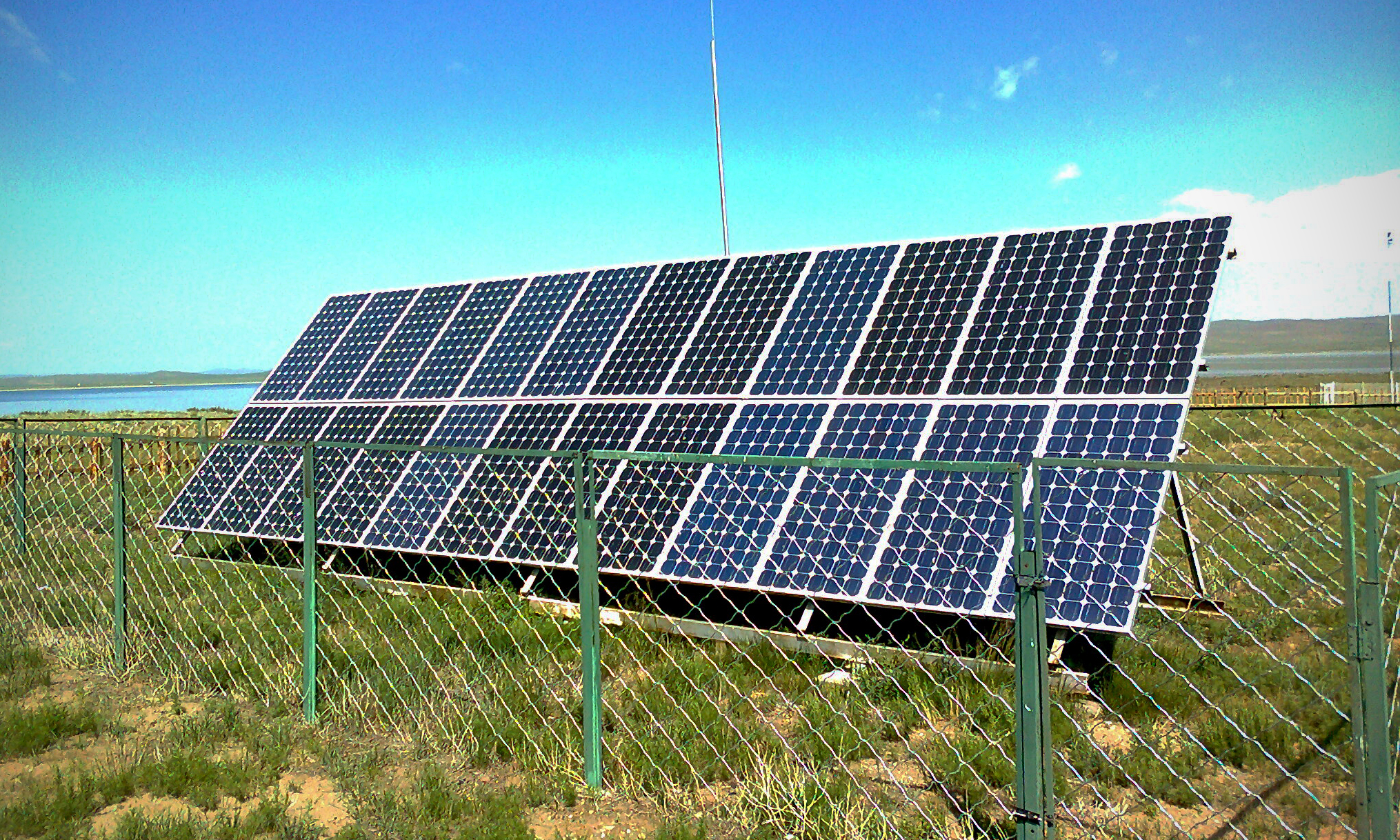
19 March 2012: researchers report that the number of solar panels in the United States more than doubled between 2010 and 2011.

- 20 March
  - Astronomers have discovered the first known rectangular-shaped galaxy: LEDA 074886.
  - New analysis by MIT shows that there is enough room underground to safely store at least a century's worth of U.S. fossil fuel emissions.
- 24 March – Humans hunted Australia's giant vertebrates to extinction about 40,000 years ago, the latest research published in Science has concluded.
- 25 March
  - Global temperatures could rise by 3.0 °C (37.4 °F) by 2050, a new computer simulation has suggested.
  - Canadian film director James Cameron reaches the Challenger Deep, the deepest known point in Earth's oceans, in the Deepsea Challenger submersible. Cameron is the first person to visit the Deep, which is located in the Pacific Mariana Trench, since 1960.
  - Physicists report that the largest molecules yet tested (molecules containing 58 or 114 atoms) also demonstrate quantum wave behavior using the classic double-slit experiment.
- 28 March – NASA announces the name of the Martian mountain, Mount Sharp, that the Mars Science Laboratory rover (also known as "Curiosity") will explore after its planned landing in Gale Crater on 6 August 2012.
- 29 March
  - "Solar tornadoes" several times as wide as the Earth have been observed in the Sun's atmosphere by the Atmospheric Imaging Assembly telescope on board NASA's Solar Dynamics Observatory (SDO) satellite.
  - Scientists have revealed the most detailed picture of the Milky Way galaxy ever produced, with over a billion stars visible in a mosaic combined from thousands of individual images.
  - New scanning technology has revealed that the human brain possesses an astonishingly simple 3D grid structure, with sheets of parallel neuronal fibers crossing one another at right angles.
