= Kokoamu Greensand =

Geological formation found in New Zealand

- Stratigraphic range: Chattian; ~27.3–25.2 Ma
- Type: Geological formation
- Unit of: Otiake Group
- Underlies: Otekaike Limestone
- Overlies: Earthquakes Marl
- Thickness: up to 7 metres (20 ft)

Lithology
- Primary: Greensand
- Other: Limestone

Location
- Coordinates: 44.7°S 170.5°E
- Approximate paleocoordinates: 50.5°S 176.3°W
- Region: Canterbury, Otago
- Country: New Zealand
- Extent: Around Duntroon, South Island
- Kokoamu Greensand (New Zealand)

The Kokoamu Greensand is a geological formation found in New Zealand. It is a fossil-bearing, late Oligocene, greensand rock unit of the eastern South Island, especially the Waitaki District of North Otago and the southern Canterbury region. The formation was named by geologist Maxwell Gage in the 1950s. In North Otago it underlies the thicker and harder Otekaike Limestone. The formation gets its green colour from the mineral glauconite which forms slowly on the ocean floor.

== Fossil content ==
The formation was laid down in shallow seas some 26-30 million years ago. It contains abundant microfossils of foraminifera, ostracods and coccoliths, those of larger marine invertebrates such as the shells of brachiopods, gastropods and scallops, as well as corals, echinoderms, and crustaceans. Vertebrates found in the formation include fish, penguins and cetaceans. Many of the fossils discovered in the formation are held in the Geology Museum of the University of Otago.

Penguins

- Archaeospheniscus lopdelli, A. lowei
- Duntroonornis parvus
- Kairuku waitaki, K. grebneffi, K. waewaeroa
- Korora oliveri
- Manu antiquus
- Palaeeudyptes
- Platydyptes amiesi, P. marplesi, P. novaezealandiae

Cetaceans

- Awamokoa tokarahi
- Horopeta umarere
- Mammalodon hakataramea
- Matapanui waihao
- Tohoraonepu nihokaiwaiu
- Tohoraata waitakiensis
- Tokarahia lophocephalus
