= Daniel T. Ksepka =

American paleontologist (born 1980)

- Born: Daniel Thomas Ksepka; March 1, 1980 (age 46)
- Education: Rutgers University (B.S., 2002); Columbia University (M.S., 2005; Ph.D., 2007)
- Known for: Research on penguin evolution; description of Pelagornis sandersi
- Scientific career
- Fields: Paleornithology
- Workplaces: American Museum of Natural History; North Carolina State University; North Carolina Museum of Natural Sciences; Smithsonian Institution; Field Museum of Natural History; Bruce Museum
- Thesis: Phylogeny, histology and functional morphology of fossil penguins (Sphenisciformes) (2007)
- Doctoral advisor: Mark Norell
- Website: Official website

Daniel Thomas Ksepka (born March 1, 1980) is an American paleontologist. His research focuses on the evolution of birds and reptiles, being specialized in penguins.

== Biography ==
Ksepka received a Bachelor of Science degree from Rutgers University in 2002 and a Master of Science degree from Columbia University in 2005. He spent five years at the American Museum of Natural History in New York City, gaining extensive experience in the conservation and study of natural history specimens such as fossils, skeletal material, skins, and geological samples. In 2007, under the supervision of Mark Norell, he earned his Ph.D. at Columbia University with a dissertation entitled Phylogeny, histology and functional morphology of fossil penguins (Sphenisciformes).

From 2009 to 2013, he was an assistant professor at North Carolina State University, and from 2009 to 2014 he was a research associate at the North Carolina Museum of Natural Sciences. In 2011, he became a research associate at the Smithsonian Institution, and in 2012, a research associate at the Field Museum of Natural History in Chicago. From January 2013 to May 2014, he completed his postdoctoral phase at the National Evolutionary Synthesis Center in Durham, North Carolina. Since June 2014, he has been curator at the Bruce Museum in Greenwich, Connecticut.

Ksepka has curated numerous exhibitions at the Bruce Museum including Monsters and Mermaids: Unraveling Natural History’s Greatest Hoaxes, Conservation Through the Arts: Celebrating the Federal Duck Stamp, and On Thin Ice: Alaska’s Warming Wilderness.

His research focuses on bird evolution, especially phylogeny, divergence dating, and the evolution of wing-propelled diving in penguins. In 2014, he described Pelagornis sandersi, the largest known flying bird, in a study that focused particularly on flight pattern modeling. He also studies the reconstruction of brain size evolution in dinosaurs and birds. In 2017, he co-described Tsidiiyazhi abini, the oldest known tree-dwelling bird species from the Neornithes, which lived about 62.5 million years ago during the Paleocene.

== Species described ==
- Erketu, 2006
- Icadyptes salasi, 2007
- Perudyptes devriesi, 2007
- Paracoracias occidentalis, 2009
- Celericolius acriala, 2010
- Inkayacu paracasensis, 2010
- Cyrilavis colburnorum, 2011
- Avolatavis tenens, 2012
- Carbonemys, 2012
- Kairuku grebneffi, 2012
- Kairuku waitaki, 2012
- Eocypselus rowei, 2013
- Pelagornis sandersi, 2014
- Tsidiiyazhi abini, 2017
- Eofringillirostrum boudreauxi, 2019
- Eofringillirostrum parvulum, 2019
- Eudyptes warhami, 2019
- Asteriornis maastrichtensis, 2020
- Eudyptes atatu, 2020
- Kairuku waewaeroa, 2021
- Centuriavis lioae, 2022
- Kumimanu fordycei, 2023
- Petradyptes stonehousei, 2023
- Eudyptula wilsonae, 2023
- Plotornis archaeonautes, 2023
