= Microcetus =

Microcetus Temporal range: Late Oligocene

Scientific classification
- Kingdom: Animalia
- Phylum: Chordata
- Class: Mammalia
- Order: Artiodactyla
- Infraorder: Cetacea
- Family: †Waipatiidae (?)
- Genus: †Microcetus; Kellogg, 1923

Species
- M. ambiguus (von Meyer, 1840) (type); ?M. sharkovi Dubrovo and Sharkov 1971

Extinct genus of mammals

Microcetus is a genus of extinct odontocete from the late Oligocene (Chattian) of Nordrhein-Westfalen, Germany.

== Taxonomy ==
The type species of Microcetus, M. ambiguus, was originally described as a new species of Phoca on the basis of teeth from late Oligocene deposits in northwestern Germany. The odontocete nature of the teeth was eventually recognized, and it was eventually assigned to Squalodon, before being made the type species of a new genus, Microcetus.

== Misassigned species ==
- Microcetus hectori Benham, 1935 = Waipatia hectori
- Microcetus sharkovi Dubrovo and Sharkov, 1971 = likely a distinct genus, but affinities uncertain
