= Ewan Fordyce =

New Zealand palaeontologist (1953–2023)

Robert Fordyce FRSNZ
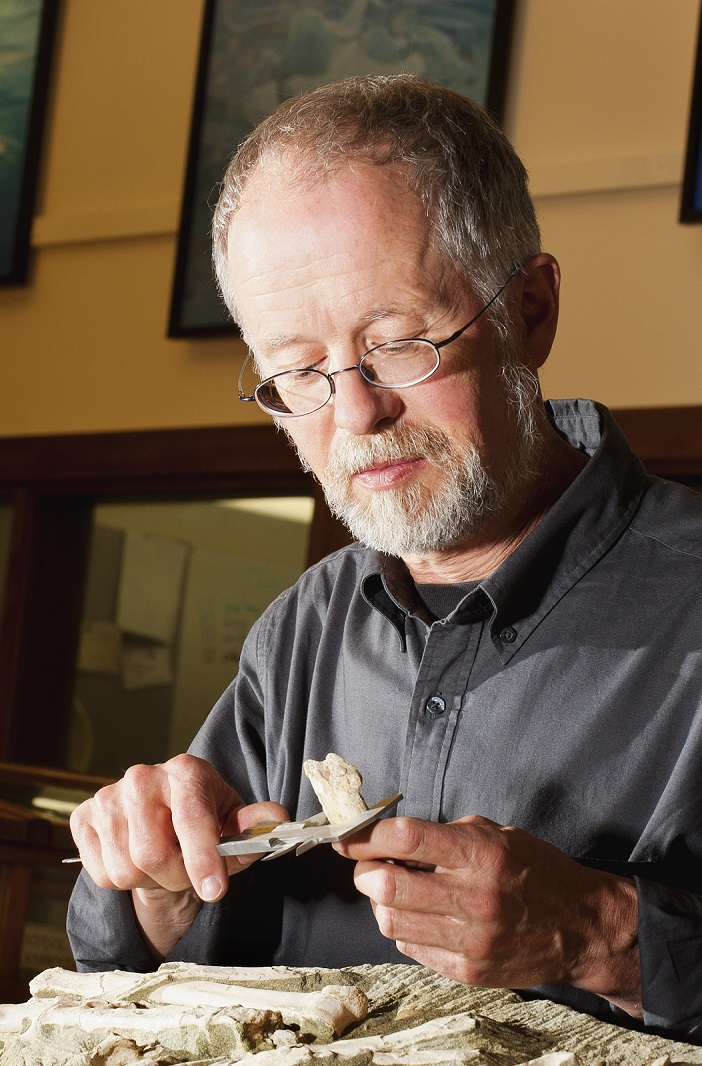
- Fordyce in 2012
- Born: 14 July 1953
- Died: 10 November 2023 (aged 70)
- Children: 2

Robert Ewan Fordyce FRSNZ (14 July 1953 – 10 November 2023) was a New Zealand palaeontologist. He specialised in the evolution of whales, dolphins, and early penguins.

== Life and career ==
Fordyce joined the Department of Geology at the University of Otago in 1982 and retired in 2021. During his career, he was involved in the discovery and description of many fossil species, including the giant penguin Kairuku and the ancient whale Llanocetus. He also had a new species of giant penguin named for him, Kumimanu fordycei, which was described in 2023.

In 2012, Fordyce was awarded the Hutton Medal for "his seminal contributions in New Zealand vertebrate paleontology, notably in relation to the occurrence, taxonomy and display of fossil marine mammals such as whales and dolphins and of penguins". In 2019, he won the McKay Hammer Award for a 2016 paper he co-authored with Robert W. Boessenecker reviewing early baleen whales (Eomysticetidae) and describing a new whale species, Matapanui waihao.

Fordyce died on 10 November 2023, at the age of 70.
