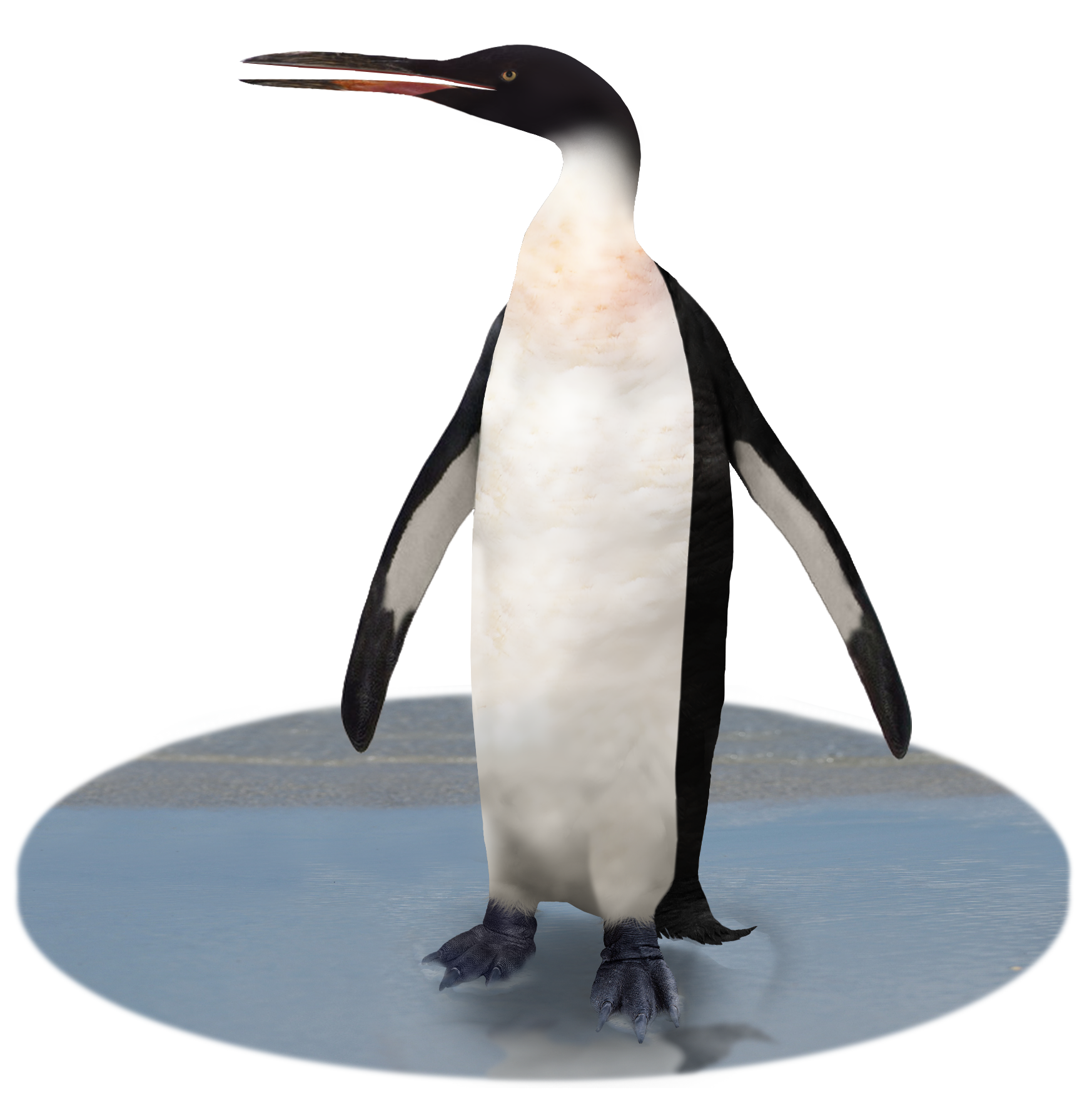
- Artist's impression of Kairuku

Scientific classification
- Kingdom: Animalia
- Phylum: Chordata
- Class: Aves
- Order: Sphenisciformes
- Genus: †Kairuku; Ksepka, Fordyce, Ando & Jones, 2012

Type species
- Kairuku waitaki Ksepka, Fordyce, Ando & Jones, 2012

Species
- K. grebneffi Ksepka, Fordyce, Ando & Jones, 2012; Kairuku waitaki Ksepka, Fordyce, Ando & Jones, 2012; Kairuku waewaeroa Giovanardi, Ksepka & Thomas, 2021

= Kairuku =

Kairuku Temporal range: late Oligocene

Extinct genus of birds

Kairuku is an extinct genus of penguin. It contains three species, K. grebneffi, K. waitaki and K. waewaeroa. This taxon is known from bones from 27 MYA (late Oligocene), from the Kokoamu Greensand Formation of New Zealand. It was historically referred to as Palaeeudyptes.

== Etymology ==
The genus name Kairuku comes from the Māori words kai ("food") and ruku ("to dive").

The species name waewaeroa is from Māori waewae - "legs", and roa - "long", referring to the elongated hind limbs.

K. grebneffi was named after Andrew Grebneff, a paleontologist from the University of Otago who died in 2010.

== Distribution ==
The fossils of Kairuku waewaeroa were found within the Glen Massey formation (34.6–27.3 Ma) in the North Island of New Zealand.

== Description ==
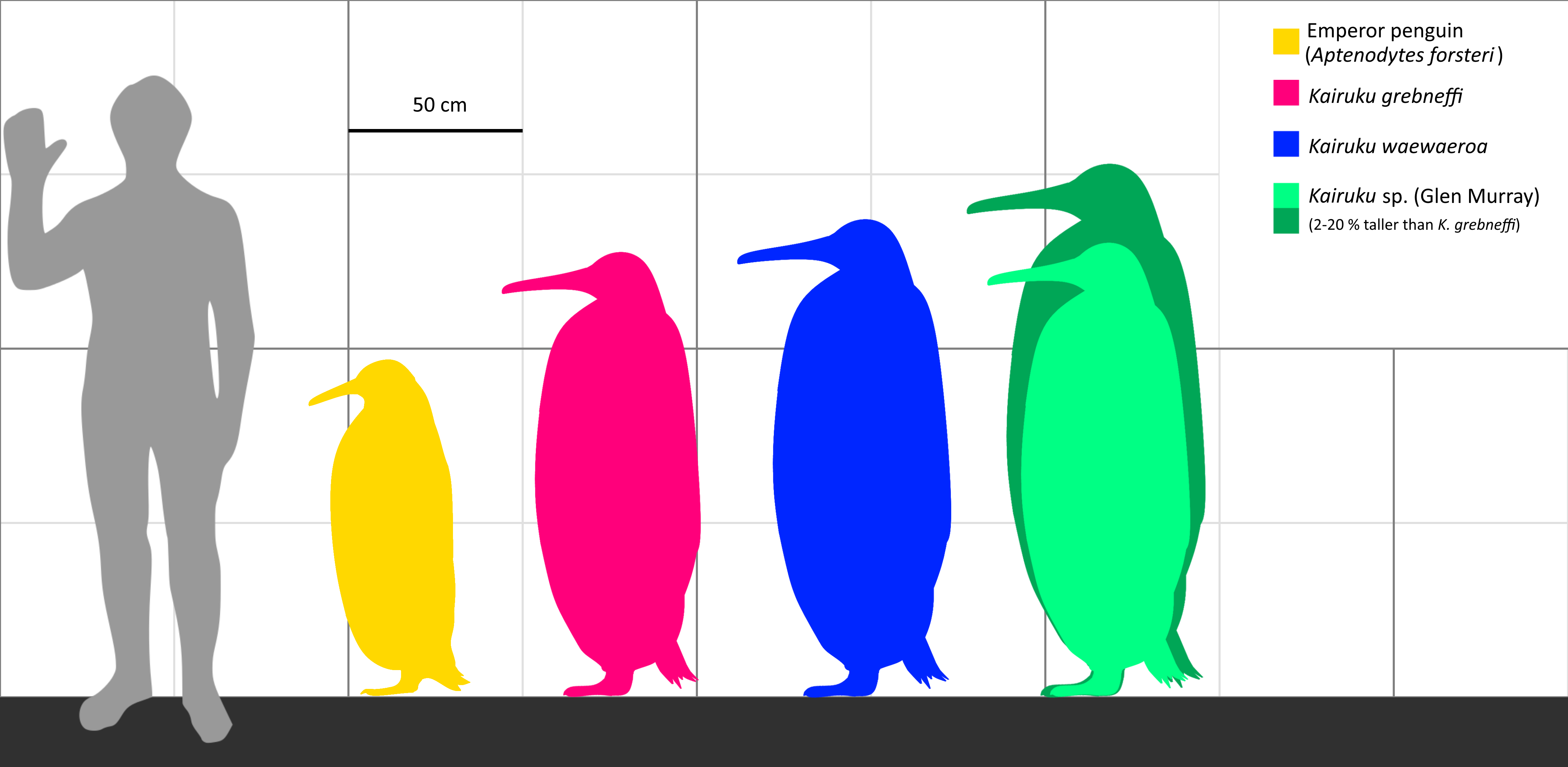
Size comparation of various species of Kairuku.

Kairuku is one of the most completely known genus of Paleogene penguins. Described species are larger than modern emperor penguin which stood around a meter, K. grebneffi stood 1.28 m (4 ft 2 in) tall, and K. waewaeroa is even larger with height up to 1.38 m (4 ft 6 in). Unnamed species called Glen Murray fossil penguin is estimated to have a height 2 to 20% taller than K. grebneffi.

=== Kairuku grebneffi ===
Kairuku grebneffi were nearly 1.5 m (4 ft 11 in) long and stood 1.3 m (4 ft 3 in) tall. Adult individuals weighed an estimated 60 kg (130 lb), 50% more than modern emperor penguins. K. grebneffi had the longest humerus bone of any penguin extant or attested to in the fossil record. The bird had a longer bill and more slender body compared to living penguins. Relative to its body size, its flippers were longer and probably more flexible than those of extant species. The bird had short, thick legs, but overall, looked much like a modern penguin "from a distance." K. grebneffi is distinguished from its sister species K. waitaki primarily on the basis of vertebrae spacing and by having a straight tipped bill, compared to the curved tip of K. waitaki. Additionally, all known specimens of K. grebneffi are larger, although small sample size prevents that from being a diagnostic characteristic.

K. grebneffi likely used its slender beak to spear fish and squid. It likely was able to dive deeper and swim farther than living penguins. Predators of the bird likely included sharks and Squalodons.

K. grebneffi lived in what is now New Zealand late in the Oligocene period, roughly 25–27 million years ago. At the time, most of the area was ocean, with a few isolated islands. It is believed that these rock outcrops provided safe breeding grounds and easy access to rich food resources in the surrounding seas. K. grebneffi lived alongside at least four other penguin species. It is likely each species fed on different kinds of fish.

K. grebneffi was among of the last of the giant penguins. The cause of K. grebneffi's extinction is unknown, but was probably related to "the drastic change in paleoenvironment" according to Tatsuro Ando, one of the scientists who classified the penguin. Other possibilities include the arrival of new predators and increased food competition.

=== Kairuku waewaeroa ===
The skeleton of the holotype is one of the most complete skeletons of giant penguins that have ever been found. Phylogenetic analysis reveals a clade that unites New Zealand endemics Kairuku waewaeroa, Kairuku waitaki and Kairuku grebneffi. The probable height of K. waewaeroa is 1.38 m (4 ft 6 in), and the length of the body from the fingertips to the tip of the beak is 1.6 m (5 ft 3 in).

== Discovery ==
The first Kairuku bones were discovered in 1977 by Ewan Fordyce, although they were not identified as such at the time. In February 2012, an international team of scientists led by Fordyce and Daniel Ksepka reconstructed a K. grebneffi skeleton using a few "key specimens" from the Kokoamu Greensand of the North Otago and South Canterbury districts of New Zealand. The specimens used represent some of the most complete skeletons found of any extinct penguin, and thus provide valuable insight into the reconstruction of all extinct penguins. The king penguin was used as a guide during reconstruction.

The holotype of K. grebneffi was collected in 1991 from a drainage area of the Waipati stream, a tributary of the Maerewhenua River.

Fossil remains of Kairuku waewaeroa, or Kawhia giant penguin, fossil remains were found in Kawhia Harbour on the North Island of New Zealand.
