= Yamatocetus =

Yamatocetus Temporal range: Late Oligocene

Scientific classification
- Kingdom: Animalia
- Phylum: Chordata
- Class: Mammalia
- Order: Artiodactyla
- Infraorder: Cetacea
- Family: †Eomysticetidae
- Genus: †Yamatocetus; Okazaki, 2012
- Species: †Y. canaliculatus

Binomial name
- †Yamatocetus canaliculatus Okazaki, 2012

Extinct genus of mammals

Yamatocetus canaliculatus is an extinct species of eomysticetid baleen whale from the Late Oligocene of Japan.

== Taxonomy ==
The holotype specimen, a partial skeleton, was discovered by curator Toshiyuki Kamei in October 1981 in the Ashiya Group of the Jinnobaru Formation on the island of Kyushu, and stored in the Kitakyushu Museum of Natural History and Human History. The genus name honors the old name of Japan, Yamato, and Latin cetus, "whale." The species name translates to "with groove" in reference to the grooves in its mouth which indicate functional baleen. It was placed into the family Eomysticetidae, a primitive group of baleen whales.

== Description ==
As in other baleen whales, the skull is wide and flat. The skull, along the sides, has several narrow, straight grooves–eight in total–and there are several foramina in the skull used as passage for blood vessels though not as many as modern baleen whales – which indicate it had baleen in its mouth. The skull contains several tooth sockets, but no teeth were discovered; it is possible these sockets were vestigial and held no teeth, or the teeth naturally fell out over the course of the animal's life. The blowhole was located midway along the snout, near the position of eyes. Unlike the closely related Eomysticetus, the head is relatively flat, and the snout is blunt. The auditory bulla in the ear is more similar to primitive baleen whales and archaeocetes.

Yamatocetus had seven neck vertebrae, and the complete series was preserved. The neural spine projecting up from the vertebra increases along the series. Thoracic vertebrae one through seven and nine were preserved. The ribs had a double-headed joint with the vertebrae. The shoulder blade was concave on the side facing the ribs, a primitive feature for baleen whales.

The left forearm and fragments of the right were discovered. As in modern whales, the elbow joint probably could not rotate. The humerus is proportionally longer than that of modern baleen whales, a characteristic of eomysticetid whales, suggesting eomysticetids had less swimming capabilities.

== Paleoecology ==
Yamatocetus was an early filter feeder, and its teeth, if it had any, were likely vestigial and served no purpose. Since the whale had several double-headed vertebral joints, and modern baleen whales have a reduced number of these to increase the flexibility of the ribcage to aid in deep-sea diving, Yamatocetus likely stayed near the surface.

Several marine vertebrates were found in the Ashiya Group: the baleen whales "Metasqualodon," Chonecetus, and an unidentified aetiocetid; and an unidentified squalodontid dolphin; a Trionyx softshell turtle; the tortoise Indotestudo takasago; an unidentified sea turtle; an unidentified crocodile; the seabirds Copepteryx and an unknown pelagornithid; and unknown dugong. An unknown amynodontid, a terrestrial hippo-like animal, was also found.
