= Mauicetus =

Mauicetus Temporal range: Late Oligocene. 24.2–23.6 Ma

Scientific classification
- Domain: Eukaryota
- Kingdom: Animalia
- Phylum: Chordata
- Class: Mammalia
- Order: Artiodactyla
- Infraorder: Cetacea
- Family: Balaenopteridae (?)
- Genus: †Mauicetus; Benham, 1939

Type species
- †Lophocephalus parki Benham, 1937

Synonyms
- Lophocephalus Benham, 1937

Extinct species of whale

Mauicetus is a genus of extinct baleen whale from the Late Oligocene of New Zealand.

== Taxonomy ==
Mauicetus was originally named Lophocephalus by William Benham, but that name was already used for a beetle, and Benham provided the replacement name Mauicetus. Three more species were named in 1956: M. brevicollis, M. lophocephalus, and M. waitakiensis. Nowadays, Mauicetus parki is considered a stem-balaenopteroid, while M. lophocephalus and M. waitakiensis have been reclassified in Eomysticetidae, with M. lophocephalus and M. waitakiensis being assigned to Tokarahia and Tohoraata.
