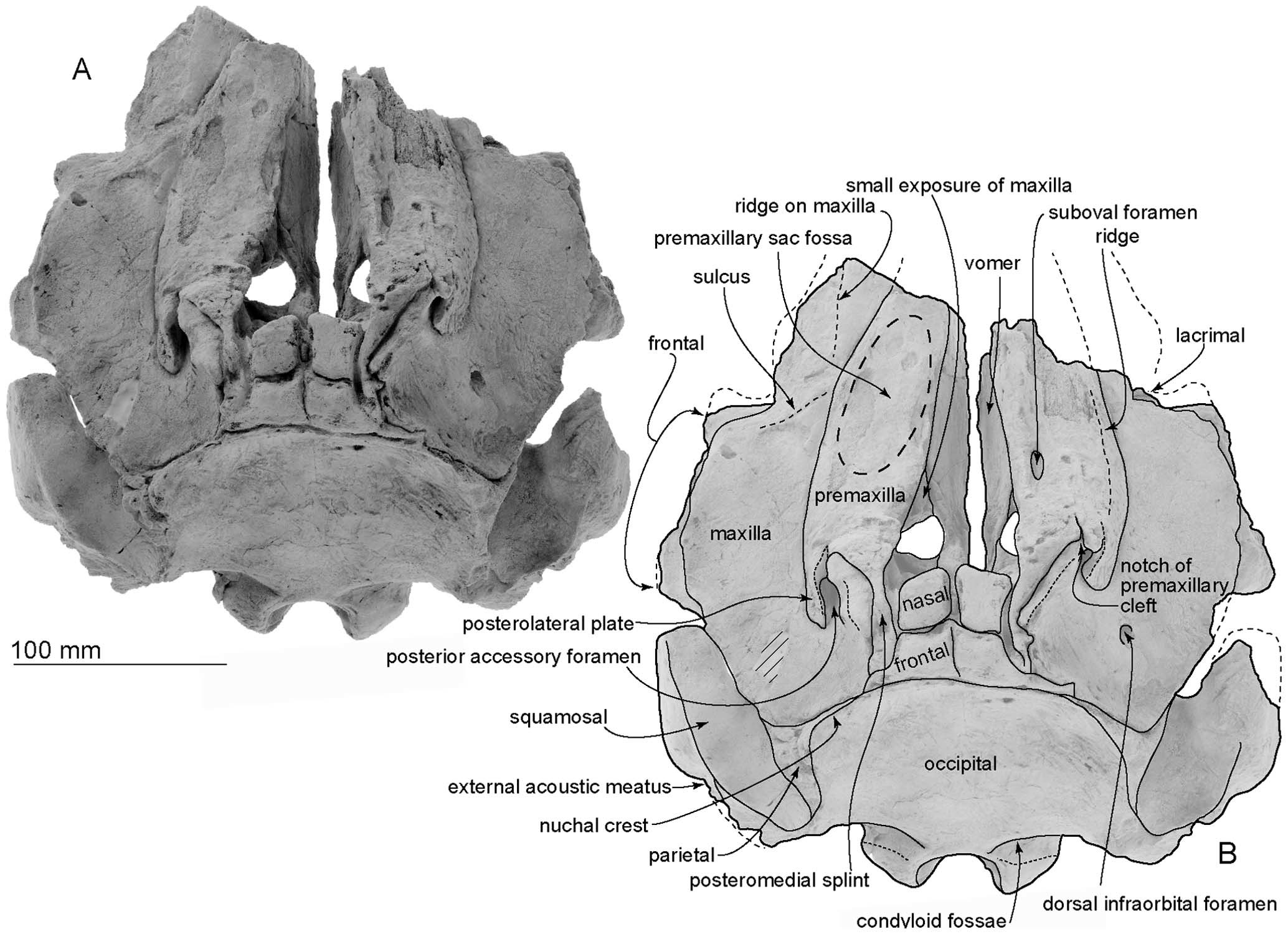
- Partial holotype skull of O. marplesi shown form above

Scientific classification
- Domain: Eukaryota
- Kingdom: Animalia
- Phylum: Chordata
- Class: Mammalia
- Order: Artiodactyla
- Infraorder: Cetacea
- Parvorder: Odontoceti
- Family: †Waipatiidae
- Genus: †Otekaikea; Tanaka and Fordyce, 2014

Species
- O. marplesi (Dickson, 1964) (type); O. huata Tanaka and Fordyce, 2015

= Otekaikea =

Otekaikea Temporal range: Late Oligocene. 24.2–23.6 Ma

Extinct genus of mammals

Otekaikea is an extinct genus of toothed whale closely related to Waipatia. It is known from the late Oligocene (Chattian) of New Zealand.

== Description ==
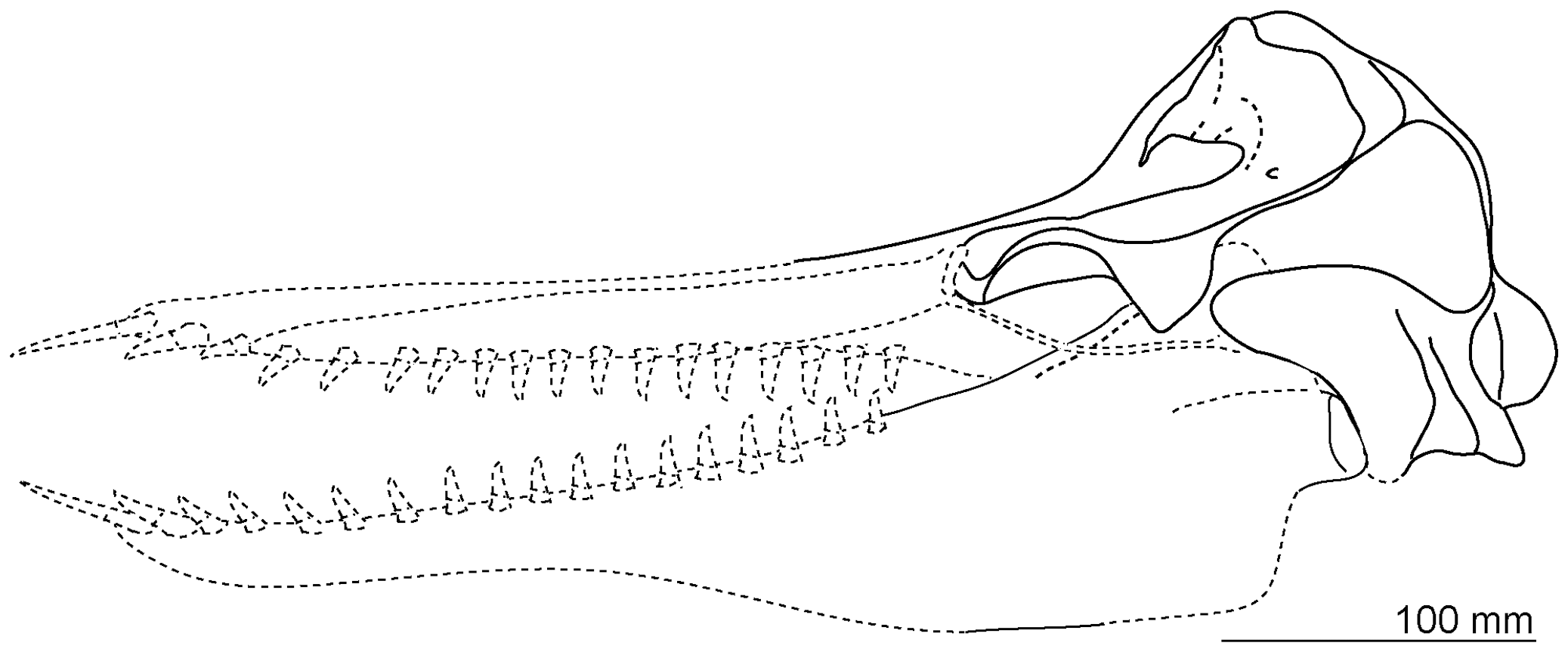
Reconstructed skull of O. marplesi

Otekaikea is a medium-sized odontocete similar to Waipatia in the following characters: maxilla and occipital partly separated by parietal; flat dorsal surface of periotic; long posterior process of the periotic; and poorly developed ventromedial keel of the bulla. Differences from other archaic odontocetes include: broad dished face; elevated nodular subrhomboidal nasals and elevated frontals; smooth-surfaced premaxillary sac fossae without prominent premaxillary sulci developed posteriorly; premaxillae strongly bifurcated posteriorly, associated with bilateral posterior accessory foramina and elevated crests on the maxillae; periotic with long slender parallel-sided posterior process, and sharp apex of anterior process.

== Taxonomy ==
Otekaikea was originally described as a species of Prosqualodon, P. marplesi. In 1994, it was referred to the genus Notocetus in the original description of Waipatia. Preparation of the holotype, however, established its affinities with Waipatia, and Prosqualodon marplesi was given its own genus, Otekaikea, after the Otekaike Limestone in New Zealand where it was first discovered.

A second species, Otekaikea huata, differs from the type species in having single-rooted posterior cheek teeth and a reduced ascending process of the premaxilla.
