= Awamokoa =

Awamokoa Temporal range: Late Oligocene

Scientific classification
- Kingdom: Animalia
- Phylum: Chordata
- Class: Mammalia
- Order: Artiodactyla
- Infraorder: Cetacea
- Genus: †Awamokoa
- Species: †A. tokarahi

Binomial name
- †Awamokoa tokarahi Tanaka & Fordyce, 2017

Extinct genus of river dolphin

Awamokoa is an extinct genus of platanistoid that lived during the Chattian stage of the Oligocene epoch.

== Distribution ==
Awamokoa tokarahi is known from the Kokoamu Greensand Formation of New Zealand.
