= Tohoraata =

Tohoraata Temporal range: Late Oligocene, 27.3–25.2 Ma

Scientific classification
- Domain: Eukaryota
- Kingdom: Animalia
- Phylum: Chordata
- Class: Mammalia
- Order: Artiodactyla
- Infraorder: Cetacea
- Family: †Eomysticetidae
- Genus: †Tohoraata; Boessenecker and Fordyce, 2014

Species
- T. raekohao Boessenecker and Fordyce, 2014 (type); T. waitakiensis (Marples, 1956)

Extinct genus of mammals

Tohoraata is a genus of eomysticetid baleen whale from the Late Oligocene (Chattian) of New Zealand. There are two recognized species, T. raekohao and T. waitakiensis.

== Classification ==
Tohoraata is a member of the family Eomysticetidae, a family of primitive baleen-bearing mysticetes (chaeomysticetes). The type species, T. raekohao, is based on OU 22178, a partial skull associated with a thoracic vertebra and five ribs, collected from the Maerewhenua Member of the Otekaike Limestone. On the other hand, T. waitakiensis, is known from OMC GL 402, a partial skull and five neck vertebrae collected in the Kokoamu Greensand. It was originally described as a species of Mauicetus, but was eventually recognized as more primitive than the type species of Mauicetus, being closely related to Eomysticetus and Yamatocetus.

== Description ==
Tohoraata is distinct from all eomysticetid taxa, including Tokarahia, in having a posterolaterally directed exoccipital. The two species of Tohoraata differ from each other in the structure of the tympanic bulla, and differ from Eomysticetus and Yamatocetus in possessing numerous foramina in the frontal.
