= Eomysticetidae =

Eomysticetidae Temporal range: 33–Aquitanian Ma Oligocene-earliest Miocene

Scientific classification
- Kingdom: Animalia
- Phylum: Chordata
- Class: Mammalia
- Order: Artiodactyla
- Infraorder: Cetacea
- Superfamily: Eomysticetoidea
- Family: †Eomysticetidae; Sanders & Barnes, 2002

Genera
- Echericetus; Eomysticetus; Maiabalaena? Matapanui; Micromysticetus; Sitsqwayk? Tohoraata; Tokarahia; Waharoa; Yamatocetus

Extinct family of mammals

Eomysticetidae is a family of extinct mysticetes belonging to Chaeomysticeti (toothless mysticetes). It is one of two families in the basal chaeomysticete clade Eomysticetoidea (the other being Cetotheriopsidae).

== Description ==
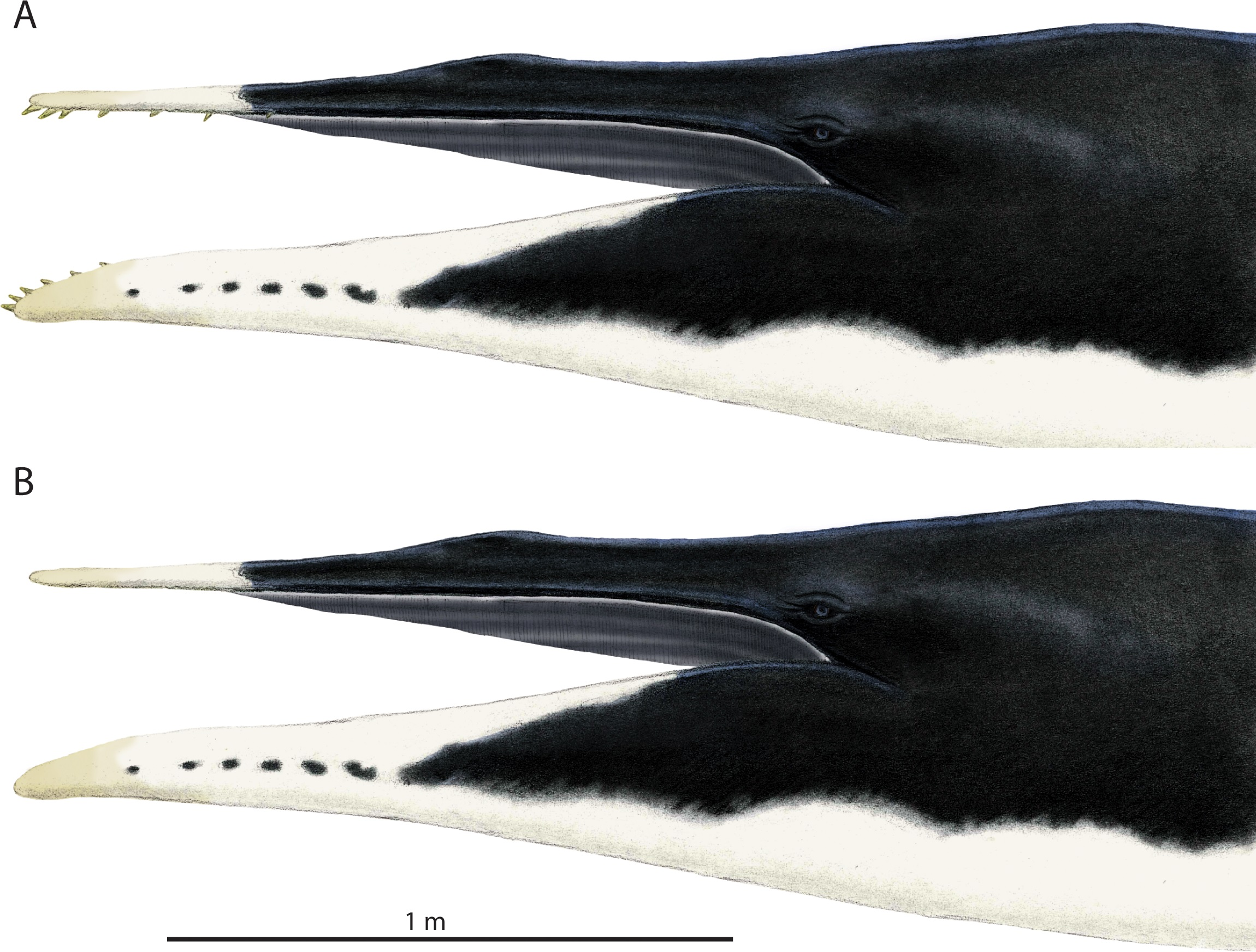
Restorations of Waharoa ruwhenua

Eomysticetids are united by the following combination of primitive and derived characters relative to more advanced chaeomysticetes (Balaenomorpha): zygomatic process without a supramastoid crest; reduction of the superior process of the periotic into a low ridge with anterior and posterior apices in medial or lateral view; blowholes situated ahead of the eyes; an elongated intertemporal region with long parietal and frontal exposures on the cranial vertex; elongated nasals; large coronoid processes of the mandibles; flat rostrum; laterally bowed mandibles; absence of functional teeth; and large mandibular foramina.

== Taxonomy ==
There are eight genera of Eomysticetidae: Echericetus, Eomysticetus, Matapanui, Micromysticetus, Tohoraata, Tokarahia, Waharoa and Yamatocetus. Two other genera are disputed members, namely Sitsqwayk and Maiabalaena.

Until the early 21st century, some of the known representatives of the family were thought to belong to then-wastebasket family Cetotheriidae, including Tokarahia lophocephalus and Tohoraata waitakiensis. However, in the original description of Eomysticetus, the similarities of "Mauicetus" lophocephalus to Eomysticetus, although Sanders and Barnes (2002) stopped short of assigning "M." lophocephalus to Eomysticetidae. Subsequent studies confirmed the placement of "M." lophocephalus and "M." waitakiensis in Eomysticetidae.

== Paleobiology ==
As members of Chaeomysticeti, eomysticetids used their baleen plates to filter krill and other planktonic organisms. Although superficially similar to thalassotherian chaeomysticetes, their large mandibular canal indicates that they were incapable of lunge-feeding as in modern-day balaenopterids. A fatty pad on the mandibular canal suggests that eomysticetids could hear underwater.
