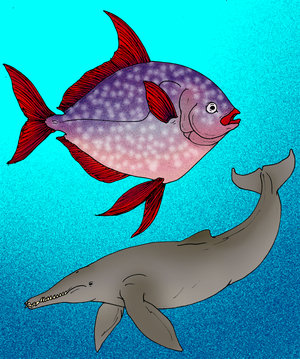
- The fish Megalampris (above) and W. maerewhenua (below)

Scientific classification
- Kingdom: Animalia
- Phylum: Chordata
- Class: Mammalia
- Order: Artiodactyla
- Infraorder: Cetacea
- Family: †Waipatiidae
- Genus: †Waipatia; Fordyce, 1994

Species
- W. maerewhenua Fordyce, 1994; W. hectori (Benham, 1935)

Synonyms
- Microcetus hectori Benham, 1935

= Waipatia =

Waipatia Temporal range: Late Oligocene

Extinct genus of mammals

Waipatia is an extinct genus of odontocetes from the late Oligocene (Chattian) of New Zealand.

== Taxonomy ==
The type species, Waipatia maerewhenua is known from a single skull found near 45° South in Otago. The second species, W. hectori, was originally named Microcetus hectori in 1935, but later recognised as distinct from Microcetus. "Uncamentodon" was informally coined for M. hectori in a table by Rothausen in a 1970 paper, but the lack of a diagnosis or description made it a nomen nudum. Finally in 2015, M. hectori was recognised as a second species of Waipatia based on preparation of additional material included in the holotype.
