= Tokarahia =

Tokarahia Temporal range: Late Oligocene, 27.3–25.2 Ma

Scientific classification
- Domain: Eukaryota
- Kingdom: Animalia
- Phylum: Chordata
- Class: Mammalia
- Order: Artiodactyla
- Infraorder: Cetacea
- Family: †Eomysticetidae
- Genus: †Tokarahia; Boessenecker and Fordyce, 2015

Species
- T. kauaeroa Boessenecker and Fordyce, 2015 (type); T. lophocephalus (Marples, 1956)

Extinct genus of mammals

Tokarahia is a genus of eomysticetid baleen whale from the Late Oligocene (Chattian) of New Zealand. There are two recognized species, T. kauaeroa and T. lophocephalus.

== Description ==
Tokarahia differs from other eomysticetids in possessing elongate, dorsoventrally tapering zygomatic processes that are medially bowed, with a concave lateral margin, an elongate diamond-shaped posterior bullar facet lacking longitudinal striations, and a transverse crest on the dorsal surface of the periotic, between the posterodorsal angle and the posterior internal acoustic meatus. It is similar to Tohoraata raekohao in having numerous foramina in the supraorbital process of the frontal, an ovalshaped incisural flange closely appressed to the anteroventral part of the pars cochlearis, a prominent dorsal tubercle between the stylomastoid fossa and apertures for the cochlear and vestibular aqueducts, a triangular anterior process in medial view with a posteriorly placed anterodorsal angle, a concave anterodorsal margin between the anteroventral and anterodorsal angles, an internal acoustic meatus that is anteriorly transversely pinched, a posterodorsal angle that is more acute and approximately 90° or smaller, and lacking a posterior bullar facet that is 'folded' into two facets by a hingeline, and additionally lacking longitudinal striations on the posterior bullar facet. However, it differs from Tohoraata in the structure of the earbone. The two species of Tokarahia are distinguished by the structure of the earbone as well as the degree of cranial telescoping.

== Taxonomy ==
The type species, Tokarahia kauaeroa, is known from the holotype specimen OU 22235, which was found in the lower Maerewhenua Member of the Otekaike Limestone in New Zealand. The second species, T. lophocephalus, is known from the holotype OM GL 412 and referred specimen OM GL 443, both from the Kokoamu Greensand. It was originally described as a new species of Mauicetus, M. lophocephalus, before its eomysticetid affinities became clear.

== Paleobiology ==
Based on the enlarged temporal fossae and enlarged mandibular canal, Tokarahia was probably incapable of lunge-feeding, although it remains unclear whether it could skim-feed or filter prey in the benthic zone.
