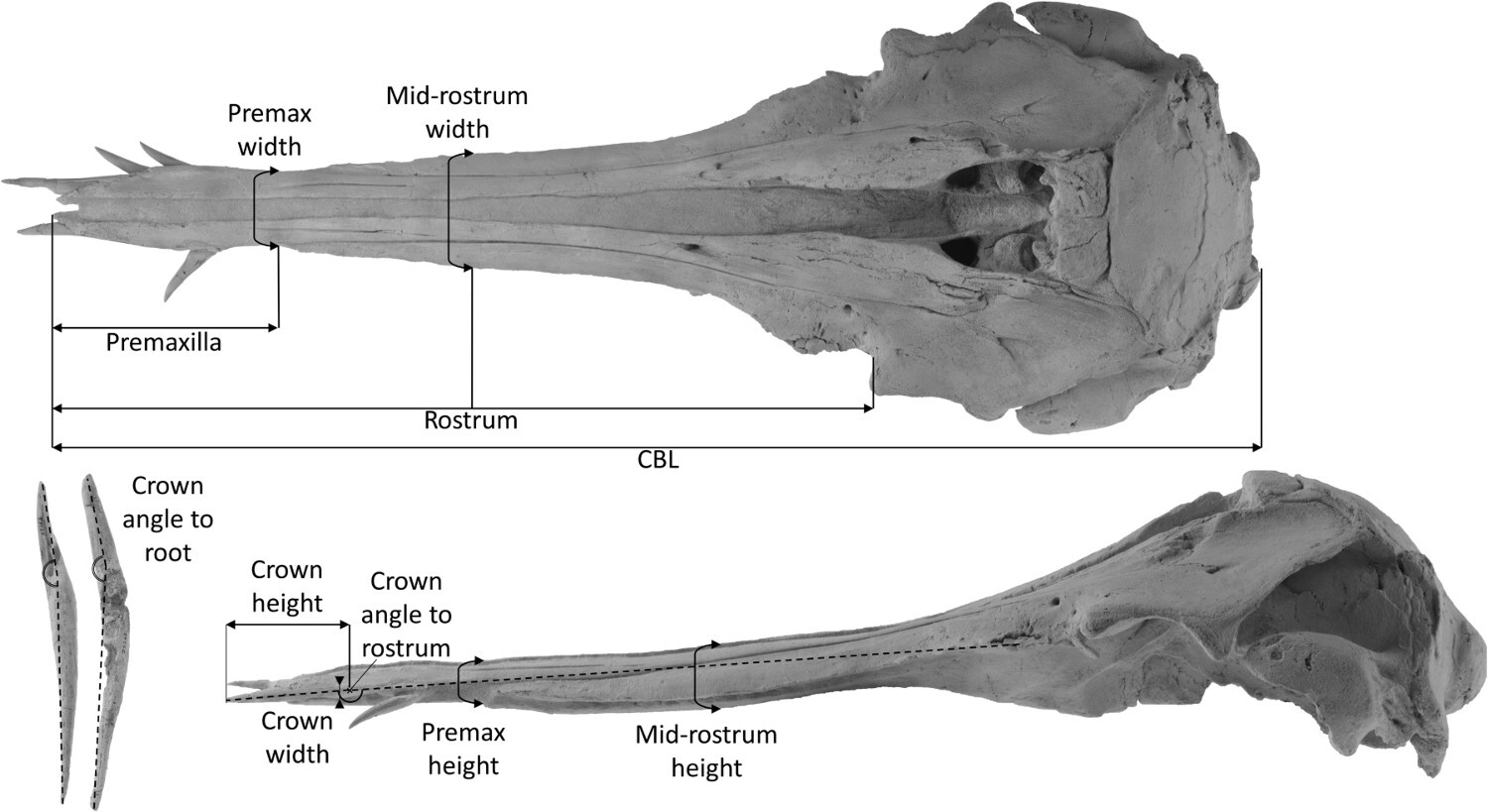
- Holotype skull (OU 22162)

Scientific classification
- Domain: Eukaryota
- Kingdom: Animalia
- Phylum: Chordata
- Class: Mammalia
- Order: Artiodactyla
- Suborder: Whippomorpha
- Infraorder: Cetacea
- Family: †Waipatiidae
- Genus: †Nihoroa; Coste, Fordyce, and Loch 2023

Type species
- †Nihoroa reimaea Ambre Coste, Robert Ewan Fordyce, and Carolina Loch, 2023

= Nihoroa =

Nihoroa Temporal range: Chattian, 25.2–23 Ma

Genus of waipatiid cetacean from the Late Paleogene

Nihoroa (Māori pronunciation: [ˌnihɔˈɾɔa]) (meaning "long teeth") is an extinct genus of waipatiid odontocete cetacean from the glauconitic Otekaike Limestone in North Otago; New Zealand. The type species is N. reimaea, known from only the holotype which comprises various skull elements.

== Discovery ==
The holotype of Nihoroa (OU 22126) was collected by R. E. Fordyce, A. Grebneff, C. Samson and G. Ferguson in late January 1992 from the top of a cliff overlooking the north-western bank of the Awamoko stream in Tokarahi. The specimen was retrieved from glauconitic Otekaike Limestone, with the sediment being a calcarenite, fine light yellow-white sand, bioclastic limestone. Nihoroa reimaea was retrieved from a stratigraphically higher location than Awamokoa tokarahi, which was retrieved from the transitional lithology between the Kokoamu Greensand and Otekaike Limestone. The suggested age for Awamokoa tokarahi was 25.0–25.4 Ma. Foraminifera from the matrix of OU 22126 include specimens of the planktonic Globoquadrina dehiscens with a first appearance datum at the start of the Waitakian stage, indicating that OU 22126 is no older than 25.2 Ma, and likely closer to 24–23 Ma.

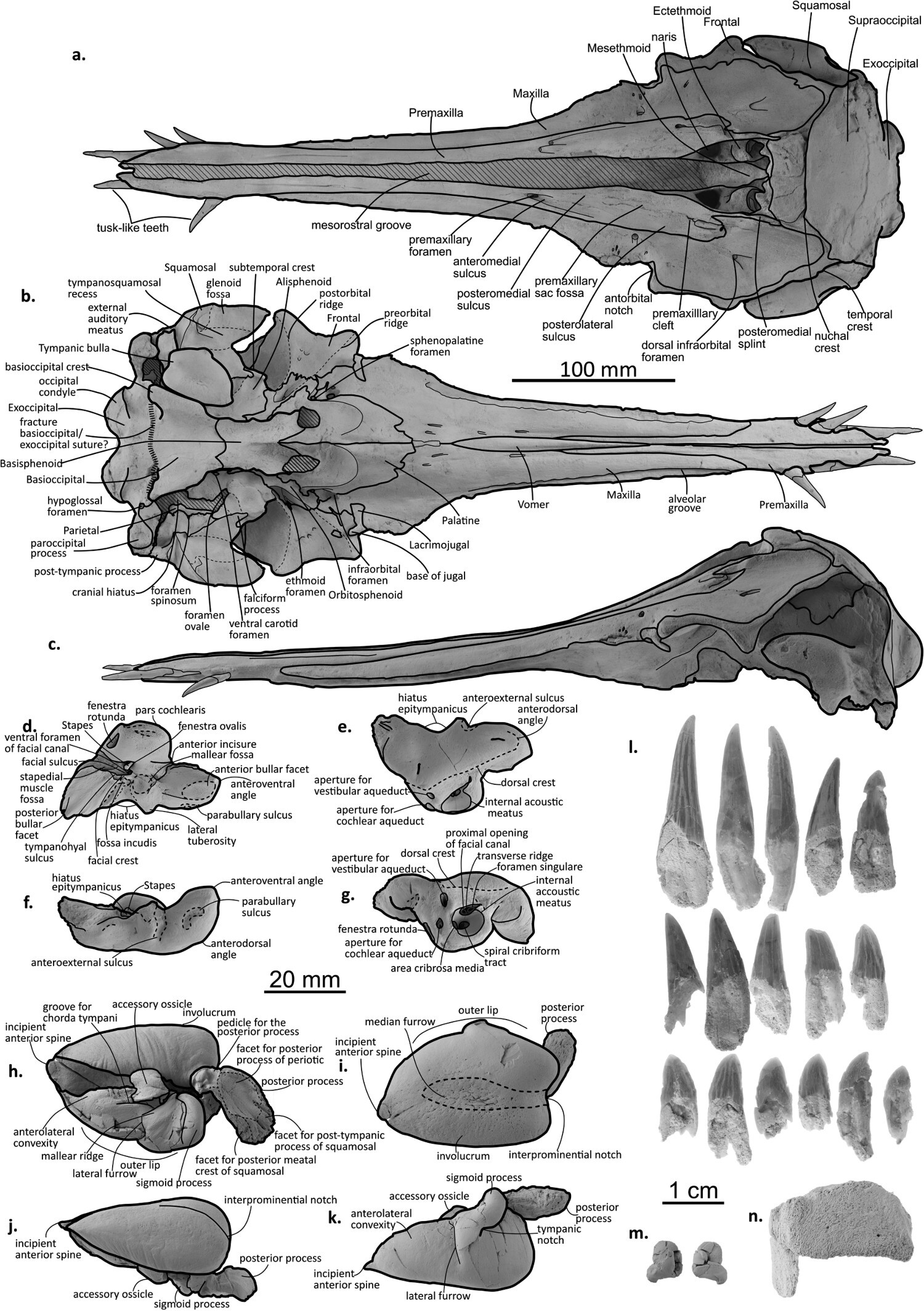
All holotype material

== Etymology ==
The generic name, Nihoroa (Māori pronunciation: [ˌnihɔˈɾɔa]), is derived from the Maori words 'niho' and 'roa'. 'Niho' translates to tooth or tusk, and 'roa' translates to long. The specific name, reimaea ([ˌɾɛiˈmaea]), is derived from the Maori words 'rei' and maea'. 'Rei' translates to ivory, and 'Maea' refers to emerging in reference to incompletely emerged tusk-like first incisors.

== Description ==
Nihoroa is known only from the holotype, OU 22126, which was described in 2023 by Coste, Fordyce, and Loch, (2023). The holotype measures at around 50 cm (19.7 in) in length. It consists of a near-complete skull missing its left nasal, both lacrimojugals and pterygoids. Both tympanoperiotics and ossicles are present other than the right stapes; the right earbones are in place in the skull, the left was removed to allow further description. Six tusk-like teeth are in place in the rostrum and a further 16 teeth are loose. The right nasal is loose and detached from the skull. However no mandibles or postcrania were recovered.

== Classification ==
In their phylogenetic analysis, Coste, Fordyce, and Loch, (2023) recovered Nihoroa amongst the waipatiids grade of basal odontocetes and most closely related to Nihohae, OU 22262 and Ediscetus. The following cladogram represents the phylogenetic results of a consensus tree which was obtained using the 50% majority rule in Tree analysis using New Technology (TNT). The original tree used several basal cetaceans as outgroups, however for simplicity only members of Odontoceti are shown below.

- Odontoceti
  - Simocetus
  - - Inticetus
    - - Waipatiidae
        - - Ediscetus
          - - Nihoroa
            - - OU 22262
              - Nihohae
        - - Urkudelphis
          - - Otekaikea
            - - Awamokoa
              - Waipatia
      - - Prosqualodon
        - - - OU 22670
            - Papahu
          - - Squalodon
            - - - Allodelphinidae
                - - Squalodelphinidae
                  - Platanistidae
              - - ZMT 73 (= Papahu sp.?)
                - - - Ziphioidea
                    - Physeteroidea
                  - - Inioidea
                    - Delphinoidea
