= List of gomphothere fossils in South America =

Locations of gomphothere fossil finds in South America, modern classification by Mothé et al
Amahuacatherium peruvium
Cuvieronius hyodon
Notiomastodon platensis
Gomphotheriidae indet.

This is a list of gomphothere fossils found in South America. Gomphotheres were elephant-like mammals that lived from the Middle Miocene (approximately 12 million years ago) to the Holocene (6000 years BP).

The following species have been described in twentieth and twenty-first century paleontological literature about South America. An alternative proposal is considered within the scientific community, listed below.

Modern classification

- Cuvieronius (Osborn 1923)
  - C. hyodon (Fischer 1814) (type)
- Notiomastodon (Cabrera 1929)
  - N. platensis (Mothé et al. 2012) (type)

== Former classification ==
Locations of gomphothere fossil finds in South America, as reported
Amahuacatherium peruvium
Cuvieronius hyodon
C. tropicus
Haplomastodon sp.
H. chimborazi
H. guayasensis
H. waringi
cf. Notiomastodon (platensis)
Stegomastodon sp.
S. platensis
S. superbus
S. waringi
Haplomastodon & Stegomastodon
Cuvieronius & Haplomastodon
Haplomastodon & Notiomastodon
Cuvieronius, Notiomastodon & Stegomastodon
Gomphotheriidae indet.

Original classification

- Gomphotheriidae
  - Cuvieroniinae
    - Cuvieronius (Osborn 1923)
      - C. arellanoi (Ochoterena & Silva 1970)
      - C. hyodon (=C. humboldti) (Fischer 1814) (type)
      - C. priestleyi (Hay & Cook 1930)
      - C. tarijensis (Cabrera 1929)
      - C. tropicus (Cope 1884) (=C. oligobunis (Cope 1893))
    - Haplomastodon (Hoffstetter 1950)
      - H. chimborazi (Proaño 1922)
      - H. guayasensis (Hoffstetter 1952)
      - H. waringi (Holland 1920) (type)
    - Notiomastodon (Cabrera 1929)
      - N. ornatus (=S. platensis)
      - N. platensis (Mothé et al. 2012) (type)
      - N. vidali (Castellanos 1948)
    - Stegomastodon (Pohlig 1912)
      - S. mirificus (Leidy 1858) (= "S. successor, S. arizonae, S. texanus") (type)
      - S. platensis (Ameghino 1888)
      - S. primitivus (Osborn 1936) (=S. rexroadensis)
      - S. superbus (Casamiguela et al. 1996)
      - S. waringi (Hoffstetter 1950)

== Gomphothere fossil finds ==
Formations are ordered according to their youngest age

=== Argentina ===
Locations of gomphothere fossil finds in Argentina
Notiomastodon (cf) platensis
Stegomastodon sp.
S. platensis (TL)
S. superbus
S. waringi
Gomphotheriidae indet.

Age	Formation	Location	Present elevation	Fossils	Notes
Late Pleistocene	Urundel Fm.	Quebrada del Aguay, Salta	596 m (1,955 ft)	Stegomastodon sp.	
Late Pleistocene		Río Dulce, Santiago del Estero, Santiago del Estero	194 m (636 ft)	Stegomastodon platensis	(Note: Reclassified as Notiomastodon platensis by Mothé et al. (2015))
Late Pleistocene	Santa Clara Fm.	Santa Clara del Mar, Mar Chiquita Partido, Buenos Aires	1 m (3.3 ft)	Stegomastodon platensis	
Late Pleistocene		San Nicolás de los Arroyos, Buenos Aires	10 m (33 ft)	Stegomastodon platensis (TL 1)	
Mid to Late Pleistocene	Yupoi Fm.	Arroyo Toropí-Level 3, Bellavista, Corrientes	61 m (200 ft)	Stegomastodon sp.	
Mid to Late Pleistocene	Luján Fm.	Luján, Buenos Aires	21 m (69 ft)	Stegomastodon superbus	
Mid to Late Pleistocene	Luján Fm.	Playa del Barco, Monte Hermoso, El Conglomerado, Cascada Paleolama, Pehuen Có, Buenos Aires	1 m (3.3 ft)	Stegomastodon platensis (TL 2)	
Mid to Late Pleistocene		Aviá Terai, Chaco	102 m (335 ft)	Stegomastodon platensis	
Mid to Late Pleistocene		Barranqueras, Chaco	49 m (161 ft)	Stegomastodon sp.	
Mid to Late Pleistocene		Charata, Chaco	100 m (330 ft)	Stegomastodon sp., Stegomastodon cf. platensis	
Mid to Late Pleistocene		Castelli, Chaco	100 m (330 ft)	Stegomastodon cf. platensis	
Pleistocene	El Palmar Fm.	Estancia El Palmar, Entre Ríos	29 m (95 ft)	Stegomastodon platensis	
Pleistocene		Punta Piedras, Punta Indio, Buenos Aires	1 m (3.3 ft)	Stegomastodon sp.	
Pleistocene		Río Carcarañá, Río Tercero, Santa Fe	65 m (213 ft)	Mastodon sp.	
Pleistocene		Bajada de Santa Fe, Entre Ríos	12 m (39 ft)	Stegomastodon sp.	
Pleistocene		Pampa de Olaen, Córdoba	900 m (3,000 ft)	cf. Notiomastodon platensis	
Pleistocene	Arroyo Feliciano Fm.	San José de Feliciano, Entre Ríos	50 m (160 ft)	Stegomastodon waringi	
Pleistocene		Tapalqué, Buenos Aires	95 m (312 ft)	Stegomastodon waringi	
Pleistocene	Arroyo Perucho Verna Fm.	Villa Elisa, Entre Ríos	27 m (89 ft)	Stegomastodon waringi	
Pleistocene	Charbonier Fm.	Valle de Los Reartes, Córdoba	870 m (2,850 ft)	Stegomastodon platensis ("=Notiomastodon sp.")	
Pleistocene	Tafí del Valle Fm.	Tafí del Valle, Tucumán	2,000 m (6,600 ft)	Gomphotheriidae indet.	

=== Bolivia ===
Locations of gomphothere fossil finds in Bolivia
Cuvieronius hyodon (="C. andinum")
Notiomastodon platensis
Stegomastodon sp.
Cuvieronius, Notiomastodon & Stegomastodon

Age	Formation	Location	Present elevation	Fossils	Notes
Pleistocene		Río Rujero, Tarija	1,718 m (5,636 ft)	Cuvieronius hyodon	
Pleistocene	Ulloma Fm.	Río Desaguadero, Ulloma, Oruro	3,880 m (12,730 ft)	Cuvieronius hyodon	
Pleistocene		Anzaldo, Cochabamba	3,038 m (9,967 ft)	Cuvieronius sp.	
Pleistocene		Betanzos Basin, between Potosí and Sucre	3,390 m (11,120 ft)	Cuvieronius hyodon	
Pleistocene		Valle de Carohuaycho, between Camiri and Charagua	1,080 m (3,540 ft)	Cuvieronius "andinum"	
Pleistocene		Chiquitos	167 m (548 ft)	Cuvieronius "andinum"	
Pleistocene		Villa Montes, Tarija	413 m (1,355 ft)	Notiomastodon platensis	
Mid Pleistocene	Ñuapua Fm.	Ñuapua 1, Chuquisaca	595 m (1,952 ft)	Stegomastodon sp.	
Early Pleistocene	Tarija Fm.	Tarija, Tarija	973 m (3,192 ft)	Cuvieronius hyodon, C. tropicus, Notiomastodon sp., Stegomastodon sp.	

=== Brazil ===
Locations of gomphothere fossil finds in Brazil
Amahuacatherium peruvium
Haplomastodon sp.
H. chimborazi
Notiomastodon platensis
Stegomastodon waringi
Haplomastodon & Notiomastodon
Haplomastodon & Stegomastodon
Gomphotheriidae indet.

Age	Formation	Location	Present elevation	Fossils	Notes
Holocene		Lagoa do Rumo/Chapada Diamantina, Baixa Grande, Bahia	400 m (1,300 ft)	Stegomastodon waringi	
Late Pleistocene		Garrincho, São Raimundo Nonato, Piauí	390 m (1,280 ft)	Haplomastodon chimborazi	
Late Pleistocene		Toca da Janela da Barra do Antoniao, São Raimundo Nonato, Piauí	300 m (980 ft)	Haplomastodon sp.	
Late Pleistocene		Gruta dos Brejões, Morro do Chapéu, Bahia	500 m (1,600 ft)	Stegomastodon waringi	
Late Pleistocene		Toca dos Ossos, Ourolândia, Bahia	770 m (2,530 ft)	Stegomastodon waringi	
Late Pleistocene		Fazenda Suse II, Vitória da Conquista, Bahia	900 m (3,000 ft)	Stegomastodon waringi	
Late Pleistocene		Janaúba, Minas Gerais	580 m (1,900 ft)	Stegomastodon waringi	
Late Pleistocene		Gruta do Ingá, Pains, Minas Gerais	700 m (2,300 ft)	Stegomastodon waringi	
Late Pleistocene		Poté, Minas Gerais	560 m (1,840 ft)	Stegomastodon waringi	
Late Pleistocene		Lapa do Caetano, Pedro Leopoldo, Minas Gerais	685 m (2,247 ft)	Stegomastodon waringi	
Late Pleistocene		Lajedo de Escada, Apodi, Rio Grande do Norte	122 m (400 ft)	Stegomastodon waringi ("= Notiomastodon platensis")	
Late Pleistocene		Caverna do Japonês & Nascente do Formoso, Serra da Bodoquena, Bonito, Mato Grosso do Sul	373 m (1,224 ft)	Stegomastodon waringi	
Late Pleistocene		Picos II, Piranhas, Alagoas	255 m (837 ft)	Notiomastodon platensis	
Late Pleistocene	Touro Passo Fm.	Touro Passo Creek, Uruguaiana, Rio Grande do Sul	52 m (171 ft)	Gomphotheriidae indet.	
Pleistocene		Aguas do Araxá, Minas Gerais	973 m (3,192 ft)	Haplomastodon waringi, Stegomastodon waringi	
Pleistocene	Inajá Fm.	Inajá, Pernambuco	355 m (1,165 ft)	Haplomastodon chimborazi	
Pleistocene	Inajá Fm.	Lage Grande, Pesqueira, Pernambuco	740 m (2,430 ft)	Haplomastodon chimborazi, Notiomastodon vidali	
Pleistocene		Roçado & Quixabinha, Petrolândia, Pernambuco	320 m (1,050 ft)	Haplomastodon sp.	
Pleistocene		Santa Cruz do Capibaribe & Panelas, Pernambuco	440 m (1,440 ft)	Haplomastodon sp. (="Stegomastodon")	
Pleistocene		Águas Belas & Santa Maria da Boa Vista, Pernambuco	360 m (1,180 ft)	Gomphotheriidae indet.	
Pleistocene		Lagoa das Pedras, Salgueiro, Pernambuco	430 m (1,410 ft)	Haplomastodon waringi	
Pleistocene		Lagoa Lajinha, Petrolina, Pernambuco	390 m (1,280 ft)	Stegomastodon waringi "(=H. waringi)"	
Pleistocene		Fazenda Nova, Brejo da Madre de Deus, Pernambuco	470 m (1,540 ft)	Stegomastodon sp. "(=Haplomastodon sp.)", S. waringi, Notiomastodon platensis	
Pleistocene		Jirau & João Cativo, Itapipoca, Ceará	65 m (213 ft)	Notiomastodon platensis	
Pleistocene		Taguara/Araras, Nova Mamoré & Porto Velho, Rondônia	150 m (490 ft)	Notiomastodon platensis	
Pleistocene		Sitio Novo, Matina, Bahia	490 m (1,610 ft)	Notiomastodon platensis	
Pleistocene		Vitória da Conquista, Bahia	950 m (3,120 ft)	Notiomastodon platensis	
Pleistocene		Fazenda Caraíba, Coronel João Sá, Bahia	266 m (873 ft)	Stegomastodon waringi, Notiomastodon platensis	
Pleistocene		Serro do Gronda, Espírito Santo	25 m (82 ft)	Haplomastodon chimborazi	
Pleistocene		Taperoá, Paraíba	530 m (1,740 ft)	Haplomastodon sp.	
Pleistocene		Upper Ribeira, São Paulo	360 m (1,180 ft)	Stegomastodon waringi	
Tortonian	Solimões Fm.	Río Acre, Acre	274 m (899 ft)	Amahuacatherium peruvium	

=== Chile ===
Locations of gomphothere fossil finds in Chile
Cuvieronius hyodon
Stegomastodon sp.
Gomphotheriidae indet.

Age	Formation	Location	Present elevation	Fossils	Notes
Pleistocene		Taguatagua, O'Higgins	206 m (676 ft)	C. hyodon (rev. Stegomastodon sp.)	
Pleistocene		Tierras Blancas & Los Vilos, La Ligua, Valparaíso	943 m (3,094 ft)	C. hyodon (rev. Stegomastodon sp.)	
Pleistocene		Parral, Cauquenes, Maule	150 m (490 ft)	Cuvieronius hyodon	
Pleistocene		San Pablo de Tramalhué, Pilauco Bajo, Osorno	14 m (46 ft)	Cuvieronius hyodon	
Pleistocene		Río Bueno, Valdivia	10 m (33 ft)	Cuvieronius hyodon	
Pleistocene		Paredones & Colchagua	55 m (180 ft)	Cuvieronius hyodon	
Pleistocene		Alto de Boroa, Temuco	131 m (430 ft)	Cuvieronius hyodon	
Pleistocene		Limahuida, Río Choapa	282 m (925 ft)	Cuvieronius hyodon	
Pleistocene		Casablanca	313 m (1,027 ft)	Cuvieronius hyodon	
Pleistocene		Chillán	138 m (453 ft)	Cuvieronius hyodon	
Pleistocene		Monte Verde	59 m (194 ft)	C. hyodon (rev. Stegomastodon sp.)	
Pleistocene		Lagunillas, Valparaíso	212 m (696 ft)	cf. hyodon	
Pleistocene		Catapilco, La Ligua	103 m (338 ft)	cf. hyodon	
Pleistocene		Marchigüe, Colchagua	170 m (560 ft)	Stegomastodon sp.	
Pleistocene		El Trebal 1, Padre Hurtado, Metropolitan Region	424 m (1,391 ft)	Stegomastodon platensis	
Pleistocene		Río Salado 1, Chiu Chiu	3,012 m (9,882 ft)	Gomphotheriidae indet.	
Pleistocene	Quebrada Quereo Fm.	Quereo	20 m (66 ft)	Gomphotheriidae indet.	
Pleistocene		Malloco, Santiago	482 m (1,581 ft)	Gomphotheriidae indet.	
Pleistocene		Algarrobo	5 m (16 ft)	Gomphotheriidae indet.	
Pleistocene		Melipilla	269 m (883 ft)	Gomphotheriidae indet.	
Pleistocene		Cerrillos, Santiago	516 m (1,693 ft)	Gomphotheriidae indet.	
Pleistocene		Chorro de la Vieja, Colchagua	1,813 m (5,948 ft)	Gomphotheriidae indet.	
Pleistocene		Cachagua	5 m (16 ft)	Gomphotheriidae indet.	
Pleistocene		Estero de Coyanco, Laja	121 m (397 ft)	Gomphotheriidae indet.	
Pliocene		Las Pozas/Chacabuco	695 m (2,280 ft)	C. tropicus (rev. Stegomastodon sp.)	

=== Colombia ===
Locations of gomphothere fossil finds in Colombia
Haplomastodon sp.
H. chimborazi
H. waringi
Stegomastodon sp.
S. waringi
Cuvieronius & Haplomastodon
Gomphotheriidae indet.

Age	Formation	Location	Present elevation	Fossils	Notes
Holocene	Quaternary alluvium	Yumbo, Valle del Cauca	855 m (2,805 ft)	Stegomastodon waringi	
Holocene	Quaternary alluvium	Turbaná, Bolívar	80 m (260 ft)	Stegomastodon waringi	
Late Pleistocene (Lujanian)	Sabana Fm.	Tibitó, Checua, Bosa, Guasca, Guatavita, Soacha, Tunjuelito, Pubenza & Mosquera, Tocancipá, Bogotá savanna, Cundinamarca	2,600 m (8,500 ft)	Cuvieronius hyodon, Haplomastodon waringi or H. chimborazi	
Late Pleistocene (Lujanian)		Curití, Santander	1,400 m (4,600 ft)	Haplomastodon chimborazi	
Late Pleistocene (Lujanian)	Soatá Fm.	Soatá, Boyacá	1,950 m (6,400 ft)	Haplomastodon waringi	
Late Pleistocene (Lujanian)	Rotinet Fm.	Rotinet, Repelón, Atlántico	8 m (26 ft)	Haplomastodon waringi	
Middle Pleistocene		Tocaima, Cundinamarca	432 m (1,417 ft)	Haplomastodon waringi	
Pleistocene		Arboleda, Nariño	2,170 m (7,120 ft)	Haplomastodon sp.	
Pleistocene		Mercaderes, Cauca	1,170 m (3,840 ft)	Haplomastodon sp.	
Pleistocene		El Remolino, Taminango, Nariño	1,470 m (4,820 ft)	Haplomastodon sp.	
Pleistocene		Toro, Valle del Cauca	970 m (3,180 ft)	Stegomastodon sp.	
Pleistocene		Medellín, Antioquia	1,500 m (4,900 ft)	Gomphotheriidae indet.	
Pleistocene		El Cocuy, Boyacá	2,750 m (9,020 ft)	Gomphotheriidae indet.	
Pleistocene		Duitama, Boyacá	2,600 m (8,500 ft)	Gomphotheriidae indet.	
Pleistocene		Sáchica, Boyacá	2,150 m (7,050 ft)	Gomphotheriidae indet.	
Pleistocene		Socotá, Boyacá	2,440 m (8,010 ft)	Gomphotheriidae indet.	
Pleistocene		Tunja, Boyacá	2,820 m (9,250 ft)	Gomphotheriidae indet.	
Pleistocene		Villa de Leyva, Boyacá	2,150 m (7,050 ft)	Gomphotheriidae indet.	
Pleistocene		Salamina, Caldas	1,820 m (5,970 ft)	Gomphotheriidae indet.	
Pleistocene		Fusagasugá, Cundinamarca	1,750 m (5,740 ft)	Gomphotheriidae indet.	
Pleistocene		Carrizal, Uribia, La Guajira	53 m (174 ft)	Gomphotheriidae indet.	
Pleistocene		Cabrera & San Alfonso, Villavieja, Huila	430 m (1,410 ft)	Gomphotheriidae indet.	
Pleistocene		Cúcuta, Norte de Santander	320 m (1,050 ft)	Gomphotheriidae indet.	
Pleistocene		Pamplona, Norte de Santander	2,340 m (7,680 ft)	Gomphotheriidae indet.	
Pleistocene		Agualinda, Lebrija, Santander	1,050 m (3,440 ft)	Gomphotheriidae indet.	
Pleistocene		Vélez, Santander	2,050 m (6,730 ft)	Gomphotheriidae indet.	
Pleistocene		Ibagué, Tolima	1,280 m (4,200 ft)	Gomphotheriidae indet.	
Pleistocene		Ortega, Tolima	2,680 m (8,790 ft)	Gomphotheriidae indet.	
Pleistocene		La Victoria, Valle del Cauca	900 m (3,000 ft)	Gomphotheriidae indet.	
Pleistocene		Zarzal, Valle del Cauca	900 m (3,000 ft)	Gomphotheriidae indet.	

=== Ecuador ===
Locations of gomphothere fossil finds in Ecuador
Cuvieronius hyodon (TL)
Haplomastodon chimborazi
H. guayasensis
Gomphotheriidae indet.

Age	Formation	Location	Present elevation	Fossils	Notes
Mid to Late Pleistocene	Tablazo Fm.	Río Cañas, Montecristi, Manabí	100 m (330 ft)	Haplomastodon chimborazi	
Pleistocene		Imbabura, Imbabura	3,200 m (10,500 ft)	Cuvieronius hyodon (TL)	
Pleistocene		Region de La Paz, Carchi	2,690 m (8,830 ft)	Haplomastodon chimborazi	
Pleistocene		Hacienca Pucará, Carchi	3,000 m (9,800 ft)	Haplomastodon chimborazi	
Pleistocene		Calderón/Carapungo, Quito, Pichincha	2,630 m (8,630 ft)	Haplomastodon chimborazi	
Pleistocene		Alangasí, Quito, Pichincha	2,539 m (8,330 ft)	Haplomastodon chimborazi	
Pleistocene		Punín, Chalán, Chimborazo	2,994 m (9,823 ft)	Haplomastodon chimborazi	
Pleistocene		Tumbaco, Pichincha	2,360 m (7,740 ft)	Haplomastodon chimborazi	
Pleistocene		Llano Chico, Quito, Pichincha	2,610 m (8,560 ft)	Haplomastodon chimborazi	
Pleistocene		Quebrada La Tola, Quito, Pichincha	2,343 m (7,687 ft)	Haplomastodon chimborazi	
Pleistocene		Checa, Pichincha	2,520 m (8,270 ft)	Haplomastodon chimborazi	
Pleistocene		La Carolina, Santa Elena	5 m (16 ft)	Haplomastodon guayasensis	
Pleistocene		Tanque Loma, Santa Elena	21 m (69 ft)	Gomphotheriidae indet. (cf. N. platensis)	
Pleistocene		Quebrada Pistud, Bolívar, Carchi	2,760 m (9,060 ft)	Haplomastodon chimborazi	
Pleistocene		Baños, Cuenca	2,760 m (9,060 ft)	Cuvieronius hyodon	

=== Paraguay ===
Location of gomphothere fossil finds in Paraguay
cf. Notiomastodon
Stegomastodon sp.

Age	Formation	Location	Present elevation	Fossils	Notes
Pleistocene		General Bruguer/Riacho Negro, Presidente Hayes	55 m (180 ft)	Stegomastodon sp.	
Pleistocene		Puerto Santa Rosa, San Pedro	72 m (236 ft)	cf. Notiomastodon	

=== Peru ===
Locations of gomphothere fossil finds in Peru
Amahuacatherium peruvium
Cuvieronius hyodon
Stegomastodon sp. "=Haplomastodon"
S. waringi

Age	Formation	Location	Present elevation	Fossils	Notes
Late Pleistocene		La Brea, Talara, Piura	3 m (9.8 ft)	Stegomastodon sp.	
Late Pleistocene		Cupinisque Desert, La Libertad	2 m (6.6 ft)	Stegomastodon sp.	
Late Pleistocene		Ocucaje, Ica	500 m (1,600 ft)	Stegomastodon sp.	
Late Pleistocene		Quebrada El Jahuay, Arequipa	1 m (3.3 ft)	Stegomastodon sp.	
Late Pleistocene		La Huaca, Piura	17 m (56 ft)	Stegomastodon sp.	
Late Pleistocene		Ayusbamba, Cuzco	3,500 m (11,500 ft)	Cuvieronius hyodon	
Late Pleistocene		Quipan, Canta, Lima	2,200 m (7,200 ft)	Stegomastodon waringi	
Late Pleistocene		Pasamayo Quarry, Lima	10 m (33 ft)	Stegomastodon waringi	
Pleistocene		Sacaco 2, Arequipa	750 m (2,460 ft)	Stegomastodon sp.	
Pleistocene		Celendín, Cajamarca	2,500 m (8,200 ft)	Stegomastodon sp.	
Tortonian	Madre de Dios Fm.	Cerro Colorado, Madre de Dios	300 m (980 ft)	Amahuacatherium peruvium	

=== Uruguay ===
Locations of gomphothere fossil finds in Uruguay
Stegomastodon waringi

Age	Formation	Location	Present elevation	Fossils	Notes
Late Pleistocene	Dolores Fm.	Campo Viñoles, Cerro Largo	105 m (344 ft)	Stegomastodon waringi	
Mid to Late Pleistocene	Dolores Fm.	Casil Quarry, Montevideo	17 m (56 ft)	Stegomastodon waringi	

=== Venezuela ===
Locations of gomphothere fossil finds in Venezuela
?Cuvieronius sp.
Haplomastodon chimborazi
H. sp. &/= Stegomastodon waringi
Stegomastodon sp.
Gomphotheriidae indet.

Age	Formation	Location	Present elevation	Fossils	Notes
Late Pleistocene		Cucuruchú, Barquisimeto	566 m (1,857 ft)	Haplomastodon chimborazi ("=Stegomastodon")	
Late Pleistocene		Taima-Taima, Falcón	40 m (130 ft)	Haplomastodon sp., (=)Stegomastodon waringi	
Late Pleistocene		San Miguel, Lara	998 m (3,274 ft)	?Stegomastodon sp.	
Late Pleistocene		Quíbor, Lara	694 m (2,277 ft)	?Stegomastodon sp.	
Late Pleistocene		Quebrada de Guadalupe, Lara	590 m (1,940 ft)	Stegomastodon sp.	
Late Pleistocene		San Juan de los Morros, Guárico	450 m (1,480 ft)	Stegomastodon sp.	
Late Pleistocene		Los Guamos, Trujillo	1,200 m (3,900 ft)	?Cuvieronius sp.	
Late Pleistocene		Minas de Guaniamo, Cedeño, Bolívar	250 m (820 ft)	Gomphotheriidae indet.	
Late Pleistocene		Los Guayos, Guacara, Carabobo	440 m (1,440 ft)	Gomphotheriidae indet.	
Late Pleistocene		Zanja de Lira, Cojedes	70 m (230 ft)	Gomphotheriidae indet.	
Late Pleistocene		La Ciénega, Pueblo Nuevo, Falcón	60 m (200 ft)	Gomphotheriidae indet.	
Late Pleistocene		Coro, Falcón	28 m (92 ft)	Gomphotheriidae indet.	
Late Pleistocene		Camaguán, Guárico	50 m (160 ft)	Gomphotheriidae indet.	
Late Pleistocene		Barbacoas, Lara	1,500 m (4,900 ft)	Gomphotheriidae indet.	
Late Pleistocene		Carora, Lara	425 m (1,394 ft)	Gomphotheriidae indet.	
Late Pleistocene		La Cruz, Guardagallos, Quebrada del Totumo, Urdaneta, Lara	185 m (607 ft)	Gomphotheriidae indet.	
Late Pleistocene		El Anís, Mérida	499 m (1,637 ft)	Gomphotheriidae indet.	
Late Pleistocene		Maturín, Monagas	90 m (300 ft)	Gomphotheriidae indet.	
Late Pleistocene		Mundo Nuevo, Monagas	900 m (3,000 ft)	Gomphotheriidae indet.	
Late Pleistocene		Orocual, Monagas	145 m (476 ft)	Gomphotheriidae indet.	
Late Pleistocene		Cumanacoa, Sucre	231 m (758 ft)	Gomphotheriidae indet.	
Late Pleistocene		Agua Viva, Trujillo	120 m (390 ft)	Gomphotheriidae indet.	
Late Pleistocene		Serranía del Perijá, Zulia	175 m (574 ft)	Gomphotheriidae indet.	
Late Pleistocene		Minas de Guasare-Socuy, Zulia	26 m (85 ft)	Gomphotheriidae indet.	

== Proposed reclassification ==
Some authors, Lucas, Mothé, Avilla et al., propose a reclassification of the South American gomphotheres as follows:

- Stegomastodon (Pohlig, 1912) is an exclusively North American genus
- Haplomastodon (Hoffstetter 1950) is a South American genus, but synonymous with Notiomastodon (Cabrera 1929)
- as Notiomastodon was defined earlier, all Haplomastodon species should be considered part of Notiomastodon
- all formerly described species as Stegomastodon sp., Haplomastodon sp. and Notiomastodon sp. belong to a single species; Notiomastodon platensis
- Cuvieronius is the only remaining South American genus outside of Notiomastodon, containing the single local species C. hyodon

Other researchers as Labarca, Prado and Alberdi agree with the placement of species into Notiomastodon, but reject the idea of a single species. They continue to use Stegomastodon waringi for South American gomphotheres from Chile.

=== Evolution ===
- Lucas (2010, 2013) proposes that Notiomastodon evolved from Cuvieronius inside South America
- Mothé et al. (2012, 2015, 2016) propose that Notiomastodon and Cuvieronius reached South America in two separate migration waves

== Gallery ==
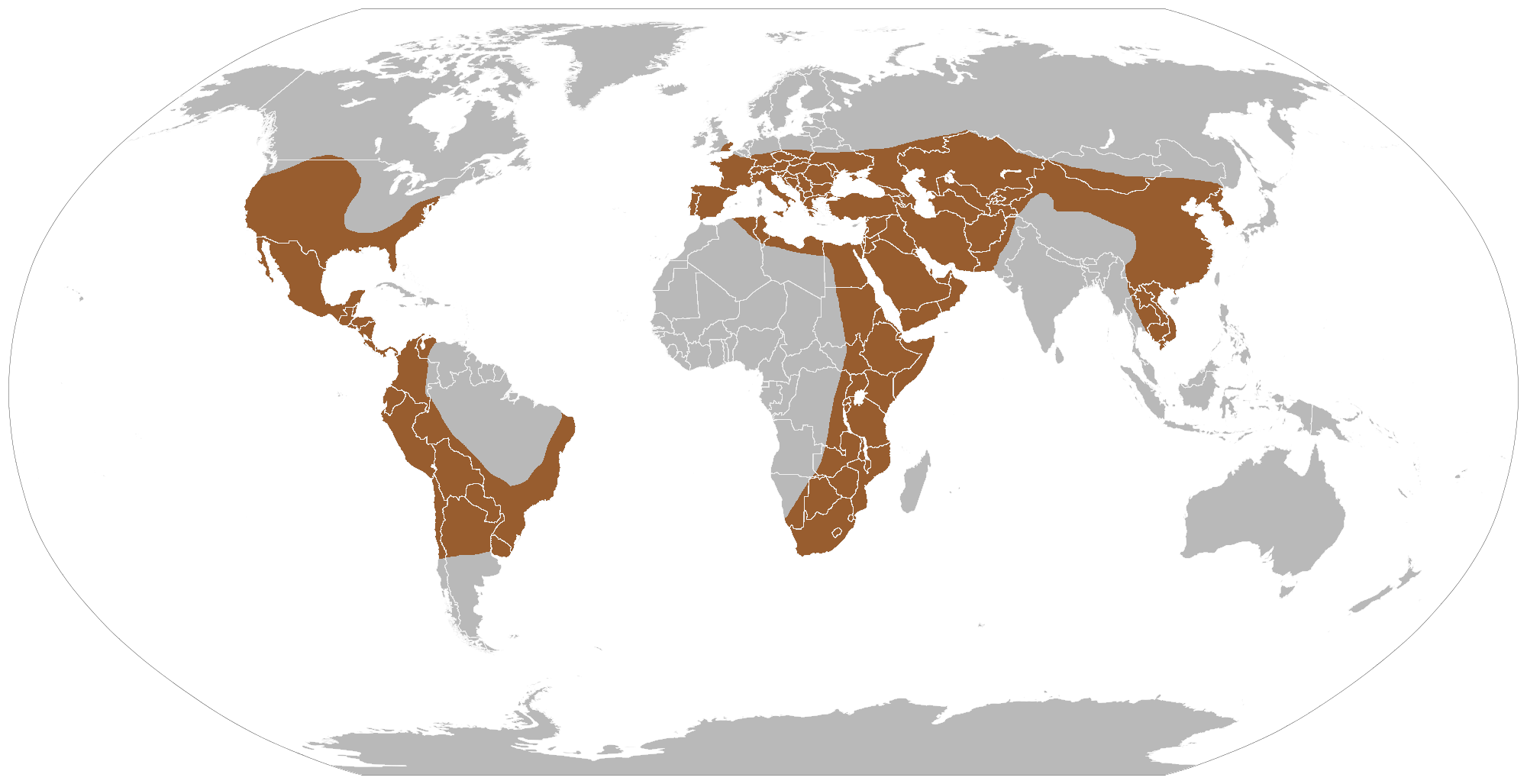
Global distribution Gomphotheriidae

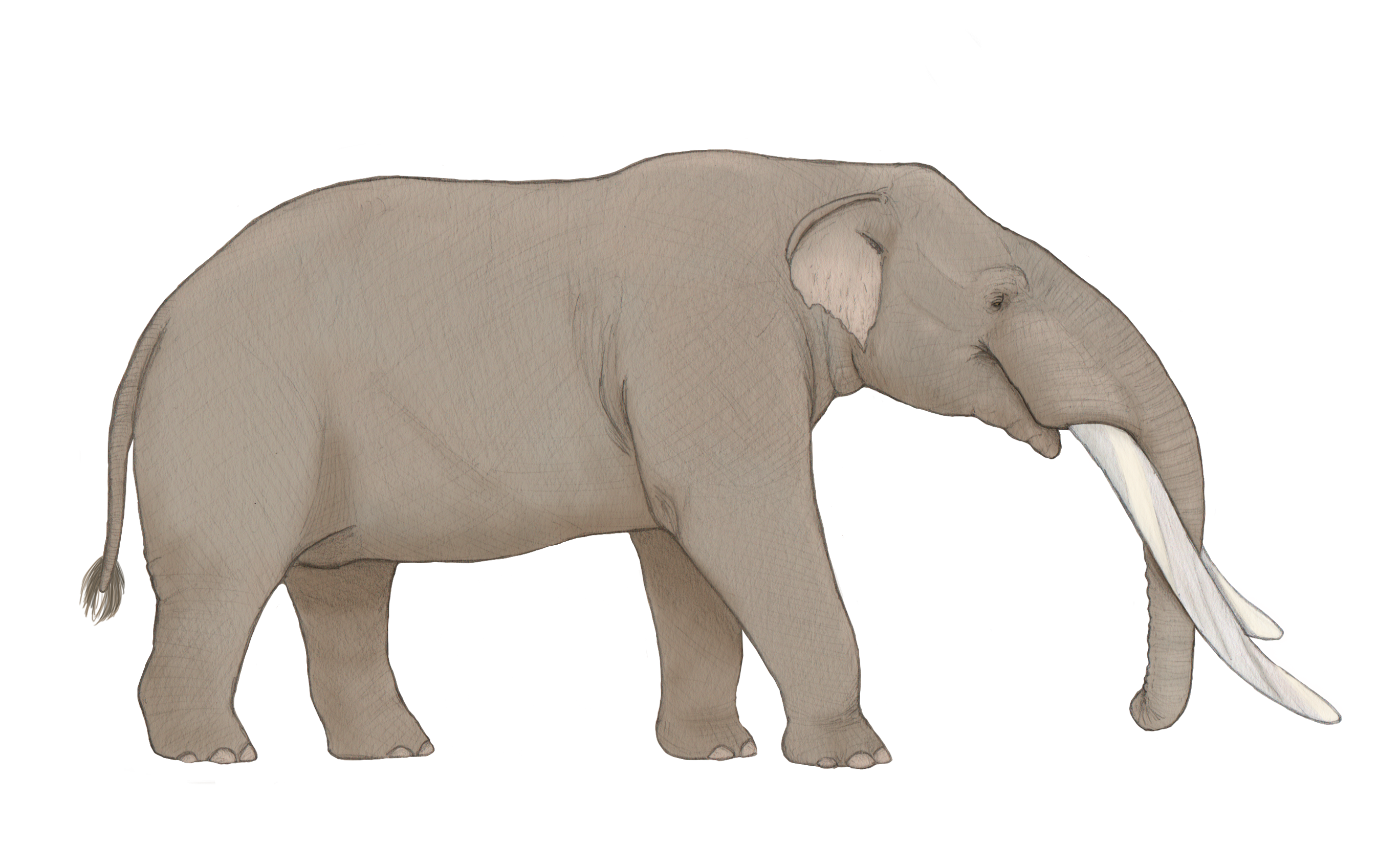
Cuvieronius hyodon

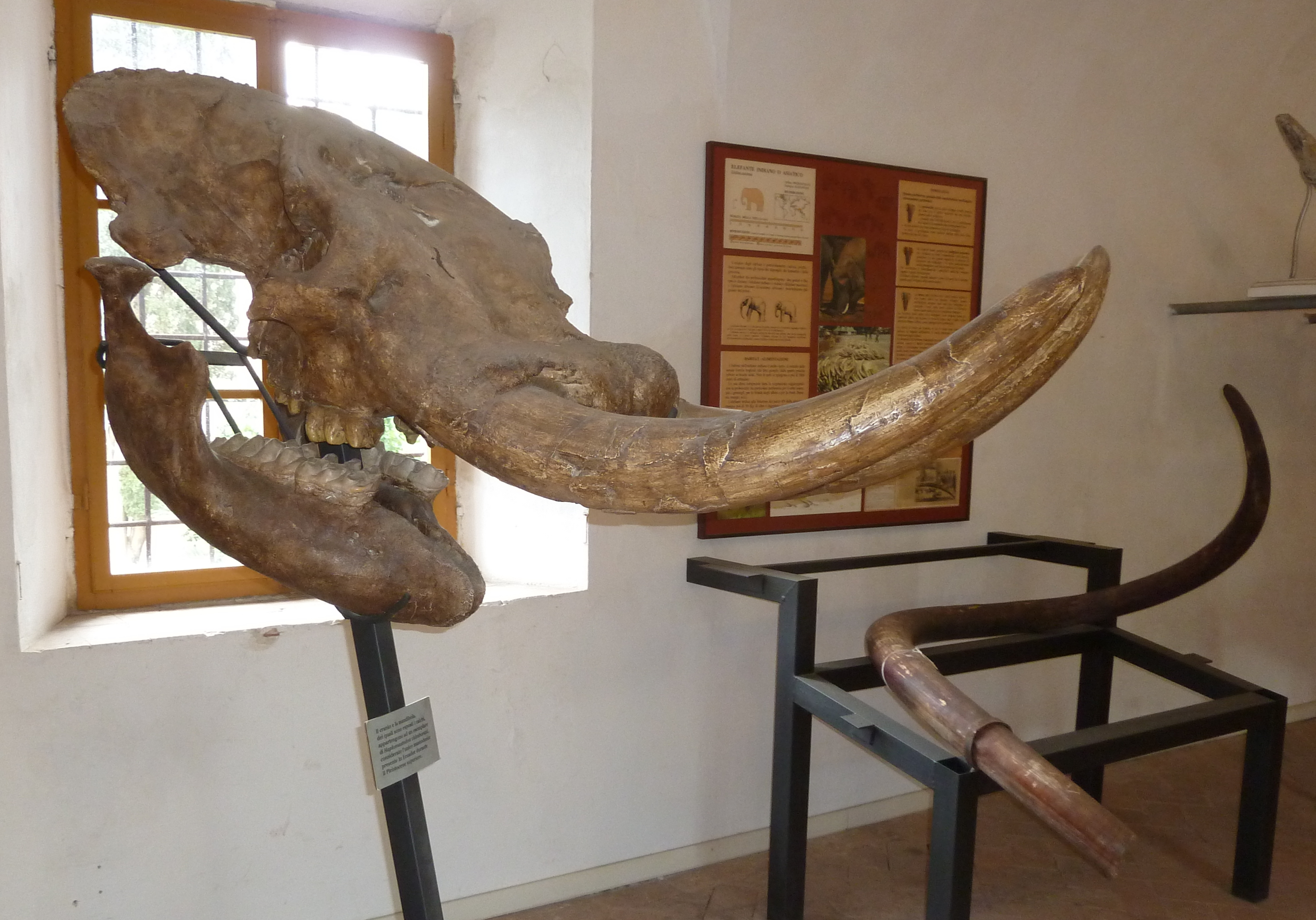
Skull of a Notiomastodon

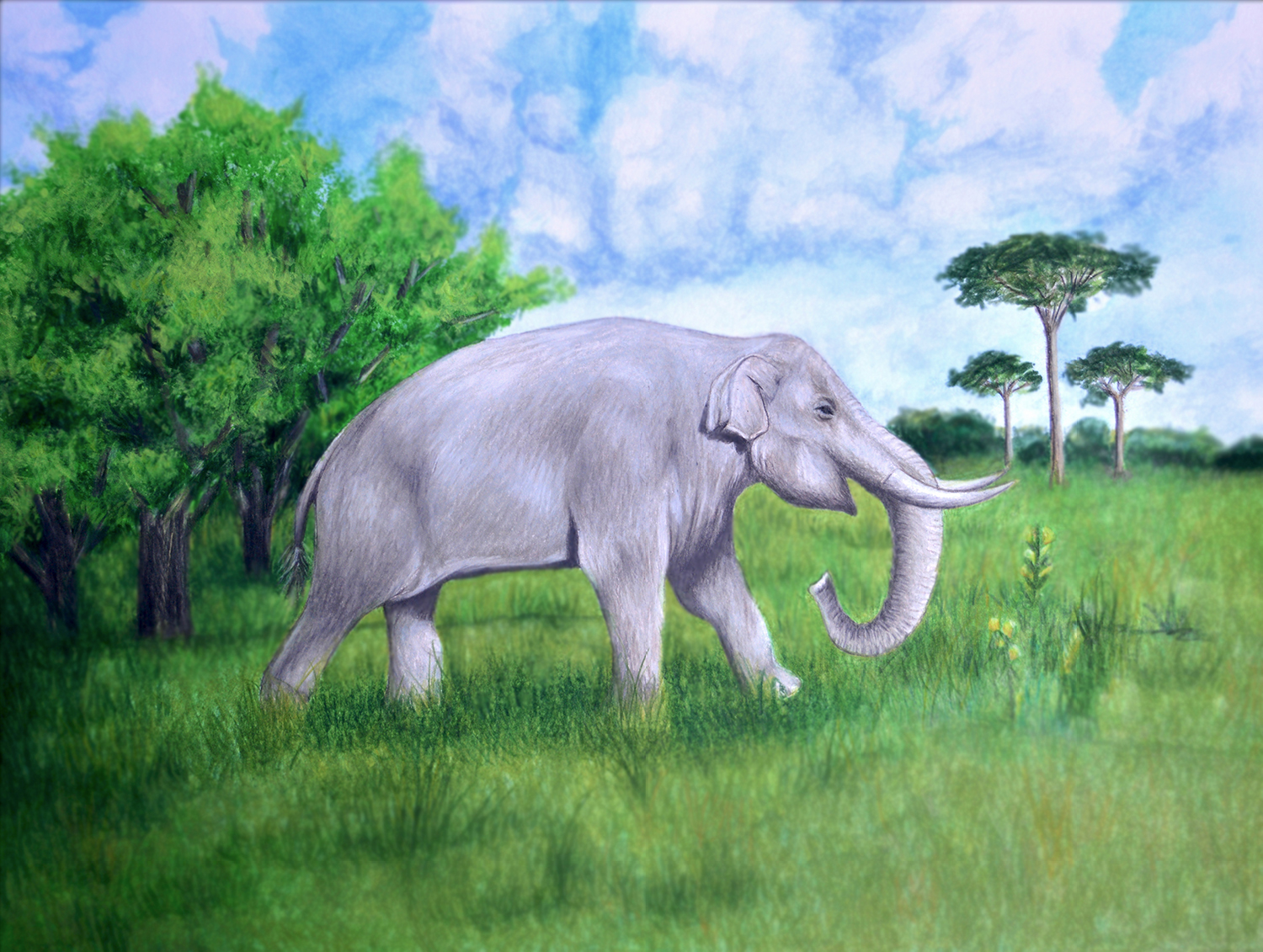
Notiomastodon

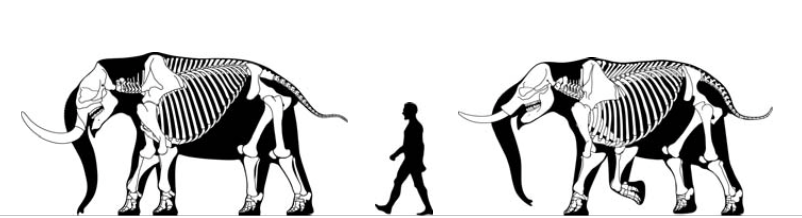
Notiomastodon and Stegomastodon compared to a human

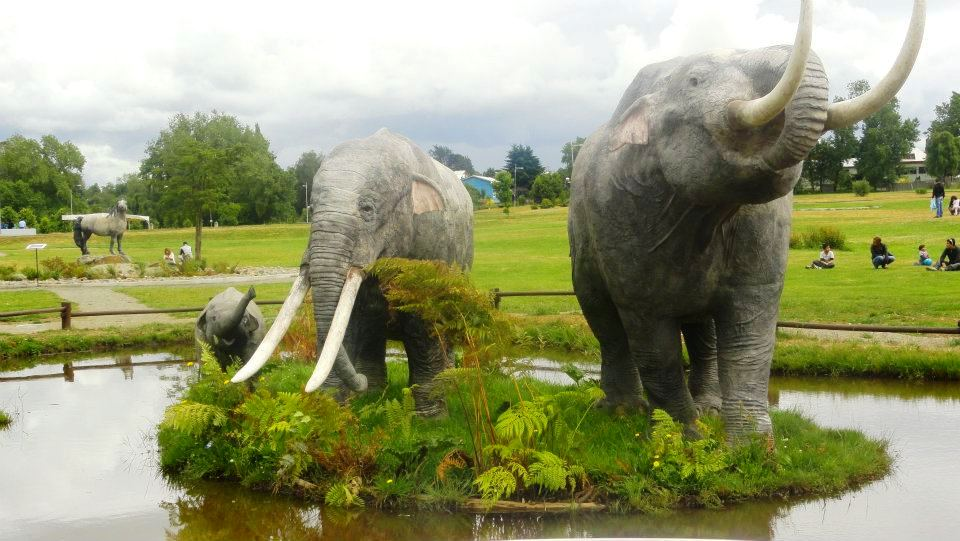
Reconstructed gomphotheres, Osorno, Chile

== See also ==
- Gomphothere
- Great American Biotic Interchange
- South American land mammal ages
- List of fossil primates of South America

== Notes and references ==
=== References ===
==== Bibliography ====
Publications are in chronological order, most recent first, because of the advances in taxonomy and research

===== Publications South America =====
- Prado, José Luis; Alberdi, María Teresa; Azanza, Beatriz; Sánchez, Begonia; Frassinetti, Daniel (2005). "The Pleistocene Gomphotheriidae (Proboscidea) from South America". Quaternary International. 126: 21–30. Bibcode:2005QuInt.126...21P. doi:10.1016/j.quaint.2004.04.012.
- Prado, José Luis; Alberdi, María Teresa; Sánchez, Begonia; Azanza, Beatriz (2003). "Diversity of the Pleistocene Gomphotheres (Gomphotheriidae, Proboscidea) from South America" (PDF). Deinsea. 9: 347–363.
- Alberdi, María Teresa; Prado, José Luis (1995). "Los mastodontes de América Del Sur". Monografías Museo Nacional de Ciencias Naturales, CSIC. 12: 277–292.
- Marshall, Larry G.; Berta, Annalisa; Hoffstetter, Robert; Pascual, Rosendo; Reig, Osvaldo A.; Bombin, Miguel; Mones, Álvaro (1984). "Mammals and stratigraphy: geochronology of the continental mammal bearing Quaternary of South America". Palaeovertebrata.

===== Publications Argentina =====
- Krapovickas, Jerónimo Matías; Tauber, Adan Alejo (2016). "Estratigrafía de las áreas cumbrales de las Sierras Pampeanas de Córdoba: geocronología, modelo regional, paleoambiente y paleoclima en una región poco conocida de Argentina". Revista Mexicana de Ciencias Geológicas. 33.
- Fajardo, Dante; Isla, Federico Ignacio; Iriondo, Martín; Kröhling, Daniela (2013). "Lexico estratigráfico de la Argentina – Cuaternario" (PDF). Asociación Geológica Argentina. Archived from the original (PDF) on 2018-01-22.
- Prado, José Luis; Alberdi, María Teresa; Di Martino, Vicente José (2012). "Équidos y gonfoterios del Pleistoceno Tardío del sudeste de la Provincia de Buenos Aires". Ameghiniana. 49 (4): 623–641. doi:10.5710/AMGH.28.4.2011.559. S2CID 131496147.
- Zacarías, G.G.; Miño Boilini, A.R.; Zurita, A.E.; Francia, A. (2012). "Campamento Vespucio, una nueva localidad con mamíferos pleistocenos en la provincia de Salta, Argentina". Estudios Geológicos. 68 (2): 277–285. doi:10.3989/egeol.40472.147. hdl:11336/25991.
- Chimento, Nicolás R.; Agnolin, Federico L. (2011). "Mamíferos del pleistoceno superior de santiago del estero (Argentina) y sus afinidades paleobiogeográficas". Papéis Avulsos de Zoologia. 51 (6): 83–100. doi:10.1590/S0031-10492011000600001.
- Tomassini, Rodrigo L.; Montalvo, Claudia I.; Manera, Teresa; Oliva, Cristian (2010). "Estudio tafonómico de los mamíferos pleistocenos del yacimiento de Playa del Barco (Pehuen Co), provincia de Buenos Aires, Argentina". Ameghiniana. 47 (2): 137–152. doi:10.5710/AMGH.v47i2.5. hdl:11336/79516. S2CID 129003421.
- Fernicola, Juan Carlos; Vizcaíno, Sergio F.; De Iulliis, Gerardo (2009). "The fossil mammals collected by Charles Darwin in South America during his travels on board the HMS Beagle". Revista de la Asociación Geológica Argentina. 64.
- Alberdi, María Teresa; Prado, José Luis (2008). "Presencia de Stegomastodon (Gomphotheriidae, Proboscidea) en el Pleistoceno Superior de la zona costera de Santa Clara del Mar (Argentina)". Estudios Geológicos. 64 (2): 175–185. doi:10.3989/egeol.08642.044. hdl:10261/17389.
- Alberdi, María Teresa; Cerdeño, Esperanza; Prado, José Luis (2008). "Stegomastodon platensis (Proboscidea, Gomphotheriidae) en el Pleistoceno de Santiago del Estero, Argentina". Ameghiniana. 45.
- Pomi, Lucas Horacio (2008). "Una nueva asociación de vertebrados fósiles de Edad Ensenadense (Plioceno tardío-Pleistoceno medio) de la provincia de Buenos Aires, Argentina". Ameghiniana. 45: 503–510.
- Vizcaíno, Sergio F.; Fernicola, Juan C. (2008). "Las bestias fósiles de Mr. Darwin" (PDF). Museo. 3: 65–69.
- Iriondo, Martín; Kröhling, Daniela (2007). "Geomorphology and sedimentology of the upper basin of the Salado River (Southern Santa Fe and NW Buenos Aires provinces; Argentina)" (PDF). Latin American Journal of Sedimentology and Basin Analysis. 14.
- Miño Boilini, Ángel R.; Canteros, Oscar A.; Alcarez, María A.; Lutz, Alicia I. (2005). "Últimos hallazgos de mamíferos fósiles del Arroyo Toropí (Pleistoceno Tardío-Holoceno Temprano) y revisión sistemática de los Toxodontidae cuaternarios de la provincia de Corrientes, Argentina" (PDF). Universidad Nacional del Nordeste.
- Zurita, Alfredo E.; Carlini, Alfredo A.; Scillato Yané, Gustavo J.; Tonni, Eduardo P. (2004). "Mamíferos extintos del Cuaternario de la Provincia del Chaco (Argentina) y su relación con aquéllos del este de la región pampeana y de Chile". Revista Geológica de Chile. 31: 65–87. doi:10.4067/S0716-02082004000100004. hdl:11336/59128.
- Tonni, Eduardo P (1987). "Stegomastodon platensis (Mammalia, Proboscidea, Gomphotheriidae) y la antigüedad de la Formación El Palmar en el Departamento Colon, Provincia de Entre Ríos, República de Argentina". Ameghiniana. 2: 323–324.
- Tonni, Eduardo P.; Prado, José Luis; Menegaz, Adriana N.; Salemme, Mónica G. (1985). "La Unidad Mamífero (Fauna) Lujanense. Proyección de la Estratigrafia Mamaliana al Cuaternario de la Región Pampeana". Ameghiniana. 22: 255–261.

===== Publications Bolivia =====
- MacFadden, Bruce J.; Shockey, Bruce J. (1997). "Ancient Feeding Ecology and Niche Differentiation of Pleistocene Mammalian Herbivores from Tarija, Bolivia: Morphological and Isotopic Evidence". Paleobiology. 23 (1): 77–100. Bibcode:1997Pbio...23...77M. doi:10.1017/S0094837300016651. JSTOR 2401158. S2CID 88948874.
- Marshall, Larry G.; Sempere, Thierry (1991). "The Eocene to Pleistocene vertebrates of Bolivia and their stratigraphic context – A review". Revista técnica de YPFB. 12: 631–652.
- Boule, Marcellin; Thevenin, A. (1920). Mammifères fossiles de Tarija. Paris: Imprimerie Nationale.

===== Publications Brazil =====
- Parisi Dutra, Rodrigo; Velloso Missagia, Rafaela; Araujo Perini, Fernando; Cozzuol, Mario Alberto; Gasparini, Germán Mariano; Gonçalves Guedes, Patricia; De Oliveira Salles, Leandro (2016). "Fossil peccaries of Late Pleistocene/Holocene (Cetartiodactyla, Tayassuidae) from underwater caves of Serra da Bodoquena (Mato Grosso do Sul State, Brazil)". Historical Biology. 29 (1): 85. Bibcode:2017HBio...29...85P. doi:10.1080/08912963.2015.1125898. hdl:11336/54277.
- Souza Lobo, Leonardo; Saldanha Scherer, Carolina; Trindade Dantas, Mário André (2015). "Megafauna do Pleistoceno Final de Matina, Bahia, Brasil: sistemática, cronologia e paleoecologia" (PDF). Revista Brasileira de Paleontologia. 18 (2): 325–338. doi:10.4072/rbp.2015.2.11.
- Asakura Bezerra de Oliveira, Yumi; Lopes da Silva, Jorge Luiz; Lopes da Silva, Ana Paula; Alves da Silva, Elaine Pollyanne; Cavalcante Omena, Érica (2014). "Taphonomic and sedimentological aspects of the "Picos II" paleontological site, municipality of Piranhas, Alagoas, Brazil" (PDF). PeerJ. 644.
- Kerber, Leonardo; Gregis Pitana, Vanessa; Ribeiro, Ana María; Schmaltz Hsiou, Annie; Oliveira, Edison V. (2014). "Late Pleistocene vertebrates from Touro Passo Creek (Touro Passo Formation), southern Brazil: a review" (PDF). Revista Mexicana de Ciencias Geológicas. 31: 248–259.
- De Souza Barbosa, Fernando Henrique (2013). "Análise paleopatológica em megafauna pleistocênica do Lajedo da Escada, Baraúna, Rio Grande do Norte, Brasil" (PDF). Universidade Federal de Pernambuco.
- De Araújo Júnior, Hermínio Ismael; Bissaro Júnior, Marcos César; Tavares dos Santos, Tirla; Da Silva Alves, Rosembergh; Paglarelli Bergqvist, Lílian (2012). "Tafonomia da megafauna Pleistocênica Brasileira: Fluvial Transport Index (FTI) em análises de representatividade óssea" (PDF). Revista Brasileira de Paleontologia. 15: 95–104. doi:10.4072/rbp.2012.1.08.
- Ghilardi, Aline Marcele; Adorna Fernandes, Marcelo; Bichuette, Maria Elina (2011). "Megafauna from the Late Pleistocene-Holocene deposits of the Upper Ribeira karst area, southeast Brazil". Quaternary International. 245 (2): 369–378. Bibcode:2011QuInt.245..369G. doi:10.1016/j.quaint.2011.04.018.
- Campbell, Kenneth E.; Frailey, Carl D.; Romero Pittman, Lidia (2009). "In defense of Amahuacatherium (Proboscidea: Gomphotheriidae)". Neues Jahrbuch für Geologie und Paläontologie - Abhandlungen. 252: 113–128. doi:10.1127/0077-7749/2009/0252-0113.
- Da Costa Ribeiro, Ricardo; De Souza Carvalho, Ismar (2009). "Megafauna do Quaternário tardio de Baixa Grande, Bahia, Brasil". Anuário do Instituto de Geociências. 32.
- Oliveira, Édison Vicente; Franca Barreto, Alcina M.; Da Silva Alves, Rosembergh (2009). "Aspectos sistemáticos, paleobiogeográficos e paleoclimáticos dos mamíferos quaternários de Fazenda Nova, PE, nordeste do Brasil" (PDF). Gaea: Journal of Geoscience. 5: 75–85. doi:10.4013/gaea.2009.52.04.
- Da Silva Alves, Rosembergh (2007). "Os mamíferos Pleistocênicos de Fazenda Nova, Brejo da Madre de Deus, Pernambuco: aspectos tafonômicos, taxonômicos e paleoambientais" (PDF). Universidade Federal de Pernambuco.
- De Oliveira Porpino, Kleberson; Dos Santos Júnior, Valdeci; Ferreira dos Santos, Maria de Fátima Cavalcante (2007). "Lajedo do Soledade, Apodi-RN, Ocorrência peculiar de megafauna fóssil quaternária no nordeste do Brasil". SIGEP. 127: 403–412.
- Trindade Dantas, Mário André; De L. Tasso, M.A. (2007). "Megafauna do Pleistoceno final de Vitória da Conquista, Bahia: taxonomia e aspectos tafonômicos". Scientia Plena. 3: 30–36.
- Trindade Dantas, Mário André; Zucon, Maria Elena (2007). "Sobre a ocorrência de fósseis da megafauna do Pleistoceno final em Coronel João Sá, Bahia. Brasil". Revista UnG. 6: 191–200.
- Cozzuol, Mario (2006). "The Acre vertebrate fauna: Age, diversity, and geography". Journal of South American Earth Sciences. 21 (3): 185–203. Bibcode:2006JSAES..21..185C. doi:10.1016/j.jsames.2006.03.005.
- Marinho da Silva, Fabiana; Da Silva Alves, Rosembergh; Franca Barreto, Alcina Magnólia; Bezerra de Sá, Fabrício; Borges de Lins e Silva, Ana Carolina (2006). "A megafauna Pleistocênica do Estado de Pernambuco" (PDF). Estudos Geológicos. 16: 55–66.
- Marinho da Silva, Fabiana; Franca Barreto, Alcina Magnólia; Bezerra de Sá, Fabrício; Borges de Lins e Silva, Ana Carolina (2003). "Levantamento das ocorrências dos fósseis de mamíferos Quaternários do Estado de Pernambuco – resultados preliminares" (PDF). IX Congresso da Associação Brasileira de Estudos do Quaternário (in Brazilian Portuguese).
- Alberdi, María Teresa; Prado, José Luis; Cartelle, Cástor (2002). "El registro de Stegomastodon (Mammalia, Gomphotheriidae) en el Pleistoceno superior de Brasil". Revista Española de Paleontología. 17: 217–235.
- Guérin, Claude; Fauré, Martine; Simões, Paulo R.; Hugueney, Marguerite; Mourer Chauvire, Cécile (1999). "Toca da Janela da Barra do Antonião, São Raimundo Nonato, PI – Rica fauna pleistocênica e registro da Pré-história brasileira" (PDF). SIGEP. 69: 131–137.
- Lessa, Gisele; Cartelle, Cástor; Farias, Helen D.; Gonçalves, Pablo R. (1998). "Novos achados de mamíferos carnívoros do Pleistoceno Final – Holoceno em grutas calcáreas do estado da Bahia". Acta Geologica Leopoldensia. 21: 157–169.
- Guérin, Claude (1993). "La faune pléistocène de la Lagoa da Pedra à Conceição das Creoulas / Salgueiro, Pernambouc, Brésil" (PDF). CLIO Série Arqueológica. 9: 15–20.
- Simpson, George Gaylord; Couto, Carlos de Paula (1957). "The mastodonts of Brazil". Bulletin of the American Museum of Natural History. 112: 129–189. hdl:2246/434.

===== Publications Chile =====
- Labarca, Rafael; Alberdi, María Teresa; Prado, José Luis; Mansilla, P.; Mourgues, F.A. (2016). "Nuevas evidencias acerca de la presencia de Stegomastodon platensis Ameghino, 1888, Proboscidea: Gomphotheriidae, en el Pleistoceno tardío de Chile central". Estudios Geológicos. 72: e046. doi:10.3989/egeol.42199.385. hdl:10261/192918.
- Labarca E., Rafael; Alcaraz, M. Alejandra (2011). "Presencia de Antifer ultra Ameghino (=Antifer niemeyeri Casamiquela) (Artiodactyla, Cervidae) en el Pleistoceno tardío-Holoceno temprano de Chile central (30-35ºS)" (PDF). Andean Geology. 38: 156–170. doi:10.5027/andgeoV38n1-a09.
- López Mendoza, Patricio; Rojas, Osvaldo; Mansilla, Pablo; Olivares, Luis; Martínez, Ismael (2010). "Mamíferos extintos del Pleistoceno de la Cuenca de Calama (Segunda Región, Chile). Viejas colecciones y nuevos hallazgos" (PDF). Treballs del Museu de Geologia de Barcelona. 17: 11–25.
- Frassinetti, D.; Alberdi, María Teresa (2005). "Presencia del género Stegomastodon entre los restos fósiles de mastodontes de Chile (Gomphotheriidae), Pleistoceno Superior" (PDF). Estudios Geológicos. 61 (1–2): 101–107. doi:10.3989/egeol.05611-245.
- Frassinetti, D.; Alberdi, María Teresa (2000). "Revisión y estudio de los restos fósiles de mastodontes de Chile (Gomphotheriidae): Cuvieronius hyodon, Pleistoceno superior". Estudios Geológicos. 56 (3–4): 197–208. doi:10.3989/egeol.00563-4151. hdl:10261/2346.

===== Publications Colombia =====
- Pardo Jaramillo, Mauricio (2012). "Reporte del hallazgo de un cráneo de Stegostadon (sic) waringi (Holland, 1920) juvenil (Mammalia, Proboscidea) en la zona rural del municipio de Turbaná, Bolívar, Colombia". Revista de la Academia Colombiana de Ciencias Exactas, Físicas y Naturales. 36: 203–210.
- Páramo Fonseca, María Euridice; Escobar Quemba, Ingrid Carolina (2010). "Restos mandibulares de mastodonte encontrados en cercanías de Cartagena, Colombia" (PDF). Geología Colombiana. 35: 50–57. Archived from the original (PDF) on 2017-08-06.
- Rodríguez Flórez, Carlos David; Rodríguez Flórez, Ernesto León; Rodríguez, Carlos Armando (2009). "Revision of Pleistocenic Gomphotheriidae Fauna in Colombia and case report in the Department of Valle Del Cauca" (PDF). Scientific Bulletin. 13. Museum Center – Natural History Museum: 78–85. Archived from the original (PDF) on 2011-07-04.
- Villarroel A., Carlos S.; Clavijo, Jairo (2005). "Los Mamíferos fósiles y las edades de las sedimentitas continentales del Neógeno de la costa Caribe colombiana". Revista de la Academia Colombiana de Ciencias Exactas, Físicas y Naturales. XXIX: 345–356.
- Villarroel A., Carlos S.; Brieva B., Jorge; Cadena, Alberto (1996). "La Fauna de Mamíferos Fósiles del Pleistoceno de Jutua, Municipio de Soatá (Boyacá, Colombia)" (PDF). Geología Colombiana. 21: 81–87.
- Correal Urrego, Gonzalo (1990). "Evidencias culturales durante el Pleistocene y Holoceno de Colombia – Cultural evidences during the Pleistocene and Holocene of Colombia" (PDF). Revista de Arqueología Americana (in Spanish). 1: 69–89.
- Van der Hammen, Thomas (1986). "Cambios medioambientales y la extinción del mastodonte en el norte de los Andes". Revista de Antropología, Universidad de los Andes. II: 27–34.
- Hoffstetter, Robert (1971). "Los vertebrados cenozóicos de Colombia: yacimientos, faunas, problemas planteados" (PDF). Universidad Nacional de Colombia. pp. 37–62. Archived from the original (PDF) on 2017-04-06.
- De Porta, Jaime (1969). "Les vertébrés fossiles de Colombie et les problèmes posés par l'isolemant du continent Sud-Américain". Palaeovertebrata. 2 (2): 77–94. doi:10.18563/pv.2.2.77-94.
- De Porta, Jaime (1961). "La posición estratigráfica de la fauna de Mamíferos del pleistoceno de la Sabana de Bogotá". Boletín de Geología, Universidad Industrial de Santander. 7: 37–54.
- Bürgl, Hans (1956). "Restos de Megatherium y otros fósiles de Quipile, Cundinamarca". Servicio Geológico Nacional (Catalog record).

===== Publications Ecuador =====
- Lindsey, Emily L.; López R, Eric X. (2015). "Tanque Loma, a new late-Pleistocene megafaunal tar seep locality from southwest Ecuador" (PDF). Journal of South American Earth Sciences. 57: 61–82. Bibcode:2015JSAES..57...61L. doi:10.1016/j.jsames.2014.11.003.
- Ferretti, Marco P (2010). "Anatomy of Haplomastodon chimborazi (Mammalia, Proboscidea) from the late Pleistocene of Ecuador and its bearing on the phylogeny and systematics of South American gomphotheres" (PDF). Geodiversitas. 32 (4): 663–721. doi:10.5252/g2010n4a3. S2CID 86792928.
- Carrión, José Luis Ramón. "La Paleontología en el Ecuador; Historia y perspectivas" (PDF). Escuela Politécnica Nacional.
- G. Cantalamessa; C. Di Celma; G. Bianucci; G. Carnevale; M. Coltorti; M. Delfino; G. Ficcarelli; M. Moreno Espinosa; D. Naldini; P. Pieruccini; L. Ragaini; L. Rook; M. Rossi; G. Tito; D. Torre; G. Valleri; W. Landini (2001). "A new vertebrate fossiliferous site from the Late Quaternary at San José on the north coast of Ecuador: preliminary note". Journal of South American Earth Sciences. 14 (3): 331–334. Bibcode:2001JSAES..14..331C. doi:10.1016/S0895-9811(01)00027-X.
- Hoffstetter, Robert (1952). "Les mammifères pleistocènes de la République de l'Équateur". Mémoires de la Société Géologique de France. 66.

===== Publications Paraguay =====
- Ríos Díaz, Sergio D.; Luna, Carlos A.; Souberlich, Ricardo; Aguilera, Paula; Gadea de Campos Cevera, Ana M.; Godoy Araña, Ana (2014). "Mamíferos del Cuaternario de Puerto Santa Rosa, Departamento de San Pedro, Paraguay" (PDF). Boletín del Museo Nacional de Historia Natural del Paraguay. 18: 67–76.
- Ríos Díaz, S.D. (2013). "Una nueva localidad de vertebrados cuaternarios en Puerto Pinasco, Dpto. de Presidente Hayes, República del Paraguay" (PDF). XXVII Jornadas Argentinas de Paleontología de Vertebrados.
- Báez Presser, Jaime Leonardo; Buongermini, Emilio; Fillipi Amábile, Víctor Orlando; Fernández Crossas, Víctor; Báez Almadas, Adolfo Benicio; Zarza Limas, Pedro Ramón; Oporto Migone, Orlando (2004). "Algunos antecedentes paleontológicos del Paraguay" (PDF). Boletín del Museo Nacional de Historia Natural del Paraguay. 15: 95–110.
- Hoffstetter, Robert (1978). "Une faune de Mammifères pleistocènes au Paraguay" (PDF). Compte Rendu Sommaire des Séances de la Société Géologique de France. 1: 32–33.

===== Publications Peru =====
- Pujos, François; Salas Gismondi, Rodolfo (2004a). "A systematic reassessment and paleogeographic review of fossil Xenarthra from Peru". Bulletin de l'Institut Français d'Études Andines. 33 (2): 331–377. doi:10.4000/bifea.5746.
- Pujos, François; Salas Gismondi, Rodolfo (2004b). "A new species of Megatherium (Mammalia: Xenarthra: Megatheriidae) from the Pleistocene of Sacaco and Tres Ventanas, Peru". Palaeontology. 47 (3): 579–604. Bibcode:2004Palgy..47..579P. doi:10.1111/j.0031-0239.2004.00376.x. S2CID 129311786.
- Alberdi, María Teresa; Prado, José Luis; Salas, Rodolfo (2004). "The Pleistocene Gomphotheriidae (Proboscidea) from Peru". Neues Jahrbuch für Geologie und Paläontologie - Abhandlungen. 231 (3): 423–452. doi:10.1127/njgpa/231/2004/423.

===== Publications Uruguay =====
- Alvarenga, Herculano; Jones, Washington William; Rinderknecht, Andrés (2010). "The youngest record of phorusrhacid birds (Aves, Phorusrhacidae) from the late Pleistocene of Uruguay". Neues Jahrbuch für Geologie und Paläontologie - Abhandlungen. 256 (2): 229–234. doi:10.1127/0077-7749/2010/0052.
- Alberdi, María Teresa; Prado, José Luis; Perea, Daniel; Ubilla, Martín (2007). "Stegomastodon waringi (Mammalia, Proboscidea) from the Late Pleistocene of northeastern Uruguay". Neues Jahrbuch für Geologie und Paläontologie - Abhandlungen. 243 (2): 179–189. doi:10.1127/0077-7749/2007/0243-0179.
- Gutiérrez, Mercedes; Prado, José Luis; Perea, Daniel; Ubilla, Martín (2005). "Late Pleistocene Stegomastodon (Mammalia, Proboscidea) from Uruguay". Neues Jahrbuch für Geologie und Paläontologie - Monatshefte. 2005 (11): 641–662. doi:10.1127/njgpm/2005/2005/641.

===== Publications Venezuela =====
- Morón, Camilo (2015). "Panorama geológico, paleontológico, arqueológico, histórico y mitológico del estado Falcón" (PDF). Boletín Antropológico, Universidad de los Andes. 33: 104–126.
- Carrillo B., Jorge; Chávez A., Edwin; Alfonzo H, Imerú (2008). "Notas preliminares sobre los Mastodontes Gonfoterios (Mammalia: Proboscidea) del cuaternario venezolano" (PDF). Boletín Antropológico, Universidad de los Andes. 26: 233–263.
- Bryan, Alan L.; Casamiquela, Rodolfo M.; Cruxent, José M.; Gruhn, Ruth; Ochsenius, Claudio (1978). "An El Jobo Mastodon Kill at Taima-taima, Venezuela". Science. 200 (4347): 1275–1277. Bibcode:1978Sci...200.1275B. doi:10.1126/science.200.4347.1275. PMID 17738722. S2CID 42568763.

===== Publications proposed reclassification =====
- Mothé, Dimila; dos Santos Avilla, Leonardo; Asevedo, Lidiane; Borges-Silva, Leon; Rosas, Mariane; Labarca-Encina, Rafael; Souberlich, Ricardo; Soibelzon, Esteban; Roman-Carrion, José Luis; Ríos, Sergio D.; Rincon, Ascanio D.; de Oliveira, Gina Cardoso; Lopes, Renato Pereira (2016a). "Sixty years after 'The mastodonts of Brazil': The state of the art of South American proboscideans (Proboscidea, Gomphotheriidae)". Quaternary International. 443: 52–64. Bibcode:2017QuInt.443...52M. doi:10.1016/j.quaint.2016.08.028. hdl:11336/48585.
- Mothé, Dimila; Ferretti, Marco P.; Avilla, Leonardo S. (2016b). "The Dance of Tusks: Rediscovery of Lower Incisors in the Pan-American Proboscidean Cuvieronius hyodon Revises Incisor Evolution in Elephantimorpha". PLoS ONE. 11 (1) e0147009. Bibcode:2016PLoSO..1147009M. doi:10.1371/journal.pone.0147009. PMC 4710528. PMID 26756209.
- Mothé, Dimila; Avilla, Leonardo S. (2015). "Mythbusting evolutionary issues on South American Gomphotheriidae (Mammalia: Proboscidea)". Quaternary Science Reviews. 110: 23–35. doi:10.1016/j.quascirev.2014.12.013.
- Mothé, Dimila; Avilla, Leonardo S.; Cozzuol, Mário; Winck, Gisele R. (2012). "Taxonomic revision of the Quaternary gomphotheres (Mammalia: Proboscidea: Gomphotheriidae) from the South American lowlands". Quaternary International. 276–277: 2–7. Bibcode:2012QuInt.276....2M. doi:10.1016/j.quaint.2011.05.018.
- Lucas, Spencer G (2013). "The palaeobiogeography of South American gomphotheres". Journal of Palaeogeography. 2 (1): 19–40. Bibcode:2013JPalG...2...19L.
- Lucas, Spencer G (2008). "Taxonomic nomenclature of Cuvieronius and Haplomastodon, proboscideans from the Plio-Pleistocene of the New World". Neogene Mammals – New Mexico Museum of Natural History and Science Bulletin. 44: 409–415.
