= Tablazo Formation =

Tablazo Formation may refer to:

- Tablazo Formation, Ecuador, a Middle Pleistocene geologic formation in Ecuador
- Tablazo Formation, Colombia, an Aptian to Albian geologic formation in Cordillera Oriental, Colombia
- Máncora Tablazo Formation, a Late Pliocene to Early Pleistocene geologic formation, in Peru
