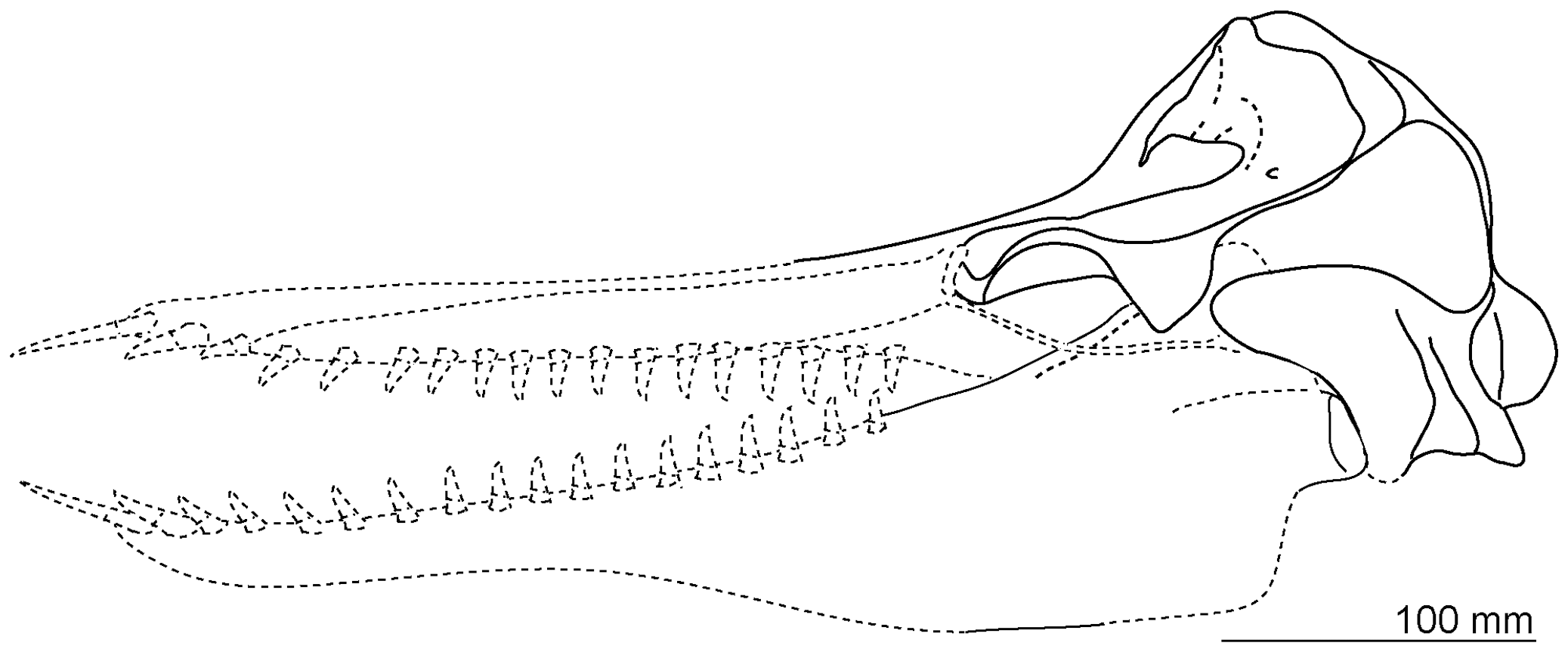
- Reconstructed skull of the waipatiid Otekaikea marplesi

Scientific classification
- Kingdom: Animalia
- Phylum: Chordata
- Class: Mammalia
- Infraclass: Placentalia
- Order: Artiodactyla
- Infraorder: Cetacea
- Parvorder: Odontoceti
- Family: †Waipatiidae; Fordyce, 1994

Genera
- †Awamokoa; †Ediscetus; †Nihohae; †Nihoroa; †Otekaikea; †Urkudelphis; †Waipatia

= Waipatiidae =

Waipatiids Temporal range: 30–23.03 Ma Oligocene

Extinct family of mammals

Waipatiidae is an extinct family of odontocetes currently known from the Oligocene of the Pacific Ocean and possibly Europe and the Caucasus.

== Taxonomy ==
Waipatiidae was coined by Fordyce (1994) to include his new taxon Waipatia, and he also considered the genera Microcetus, Sachalinocetus, and Sulakocetus to be possible waipatiids. The taxon "Prosqualodon" marplesi was recognized in the 2010s as being a member of Waipatiidae and given its own genus, Otekaikea.
