= Nihohae =

Nihohae Temporal range: Late Oligocene. 25.2 Ma

Scientific classification
- Kingdom: Animalia
- Phylum: Chordata
- Class: Mammalia
- Infraclass: Placentalia
- Order: Artiodactyla
- Infraorder: Cetacea
- Family: †Waipatiidae
- Genus: †Nihohae; Coste, Fordyce, & Loch, 2023
- Species: †N. matakoi

Binomial name
- †Nihohae matakoi Coste, Fordyce, & Loch, 2023

Prehistoric cetacean genus

Nihohae (meaning “slashing teeth”; pronounced Nee-Ho-Hah-Ey) is an extinct genus of waipatiid dolphin that was native to the waters surrounding New Zealand during the Oligocene. It possessed long, tusk-like teeth unlike those of any extant cetacean, which were likely used like the “saw” of a sawfish to stun and injure prey. The genus contains a single species, N. matakoi, known from a partial skull and skeleton.

== Discovery and naming ==
The Nihohae holotype was discovered in the Awamoko Valley on New Zealand's South Island by Seabourne Rust, a student of Ewan Fordyce in 1998. The fossils that were uncovered at the dig site include a nearly complete skull missing the right jugal and both lacrimals and pterygoids, both periotics, bullae, and stapes, and a total of 42 teeth, half of which were in place. The postcranial material consists of a single fragmentary atlas, an axis, eight vertebrae (four thoracic, two cervical, and two caudal), and seven ribs. The skull of the animal measured 56 cm (22.1 in) in length and measured 21.5 cm (8.5 in) in width.

In 2023, Coste, Fordyce, & Loch described Nihohae matakoi as a new genus and species of waipatiid cetacean based on these fossil remains. The generic name, "Nihohae", combines the Māori words "Niho", meaning "teeth", and "Hae", meaning "slashing", in reference to the teeth's possible hunting use. The specific name, "matakoi", combines the Māori words "Mata", meaning "face" or "point", and "Koi", meaning "sharp", referencing its rostrum which ends in sharp incisors.

== Description ==
Nihohae possesses a long and straight rostrum, which makes up 66% of its skull length. The shallow mesorostral groove, which runs across the roof of its skull towards the nasals, is wide and open, with parallel lateral edges. The premaxilla makes up the anterior 88 mm of the rostrum, and possesses three horizontally procumbent tusk-like incisors. The mandibular symphysis is long, making up 38% of the mandibles total length. Its estimated 66 teeth were heterodont and polydont, meaning that they possessed a variety of different types of teeth. Its incisors, canines, and first postcanines, as well as the second postcanines in its rostrum, were single rooted, the third postcanines, and, in the rostrum, also the fourth, were partially double-rooted, while the remaining 38 teeth were double-rooted. The tusks ranged between 82 mm and over 112 mm in length, and reached a width of up to 10 mm. Besides the tusks harboured in the premaxilla, several more loose tusks are known. These possessed roots which were about twice as long as their crowns, being about 82 mm and 44 mm, respectively. Its rostral canine and the first two postcanines are conical, though they possess prominent keels. Farther posterior, the teeth change from very large to small, flattened, nearly vertical and triangular. Several of these cheek teeth possess small denticles, separated by fissures along the keel. The enamel covering its teeth was thin, being only about 80 μm thick, compared to 365 μm in squalodontids and 130 μm in the modern dolphin Stenella.

== Phylogeny ==
Since the discovery of its type specimen, it has been suggested that Nihohae belongs to the Waipatiidae, a small family of odontocetes only known from the Oligocene. Although only the genus Waipatia certainly belongs to the family, a variety of other genera have also been referred to the family in the past. Among those, Coste et al. recovers Otekaikea, Awamokoa, Urkudelphis and Ediscetus, as well as Waipatia and Nihohae, as waipatiids forming a monophyletic clade, whereas other genera, such as Microcetus and Sulakocetus, are excluded. Within the family, Nihohae forms a clade with the undescribed specimens OU 22262 and OU 22126 as well as Ediscetus, which is basal to the other three taxa.

Below is the internal phylogeny of the waipatiids as recovered by Coste et al. (2023):

- - Ediscetus osbornei
  - - OU 22126
    - - OU 22262
      - Nihohae matakoi
- - Urkudelphis chawpipacha
  - - - Otekaikea huata
      - Otekaikea marplesi
    - - Awamokoa tokarahi
      - - Waipatia maerewhenua
        - Waipatia hectori

== Palaeobiology ==
Both the rostrum and mandibular symphysis of Nihohae had a proportional length similar to that seen in river dolphins and gharials, although its broad base is more similar to that of the Clymene dolphin than to the longirostrine Ganges river dolphin. A further difference is that the Ganges dolphins possesses a mediolaterally compressed rostrum, with a height/width-ratio of 1.17, whereas that of Nihohae is dorsoventrally flattened, resulting in a height/width-ratio of 0.51. This results in a notable difference in aquatic movement, with mediolaterally compressed rostra being more hydrodynamic when moving vertically, and mediolaterally compressed rostra being more suited to horizontal movements. The length of rostrum and mandibular symphysis furthermore indicates that Nihohae could rapidly snap its jaws, but was not capable of producing high anterior bite forces, and had a reduced capability of shaking and twisting prey animals, indicating that the size of its prey was rather small. This is furthermore by how thin and gracile its tusks are, compared to those of taxa such as Ankylorhiza, which may have used them for the processing of large prey. This also indicates that they were generally not used for intraspecific combat or for defence against other animals, although the broken incisor observed in the type specimen may be the result of a sudden need to defend itself from a predator. The lack of wear on the teeth of Nihohae furthermore indicates that it neither consumed abrasive prey nor used their teeth to search the substrate for food. However, its cervical vertebrae were unfused, as in modern belugas, narwhals and river dolphins, while the exoccipital and mastoid process of the squamosal are broad, indicating significant attachment areas for the m. sternocephalicus and m. brachiocephalicus, which are the most important muscles for lateral head movements, showcasing that it was capable of a broad range of neck movements, including lateral, dorsoventral and rotational ones. Its tusks lie too flat relative to each other to pierce prey, as has been suggested for Waipatia, nor trap fish between them, as has been proposed for the pterosaur Rhamporhynchus. The most likely explanation is that its feeding apparatus was most similar to that observed in sawfish and sawsharks, with the tusks being used to injure and stun soft-bodied prey such as squid prey during swift lateral movements of the head.
