= List of fossiliferous stratigraphic units in Ecuador =

Geology of Ecuador

Major fossiliferous stratigraphic units in Ecuador
Cangahua Formation
Plio-Pleistocene
Early Pliocene
Onzole Formation
Letrero Formation
Viche Formation
Dos Bocas Formation
Seca Formation
Napo Group
Cazaderos Formation
Ciano Formation

This is a list of fossiliferous stratigraphic units in Ecuador.

== List of fossiliferous stratigraphic units ==
Group	Formation	Period	Notes
	Cangahua Formation	Late Pleistocene	
	Tablazo Formation	Late Pliocene-Late Pleistocene	
	Jama Formation	Pliocene-Early Pleistocene	
	Canoa Formation	Piacenzian-Calabrian	
	Esmeraldas Formation	Early Pliocene	
Daule	Onzole Formation	Early Pliocene	
	Cachabi Formation	Late Miocene-Early Pliocene	
	Punta Gorda Formation	Late Miocene-Early Pliocene	
Santiago	Angostura Formation	Late Miocene	
Santiago	Picaderos Formation	Late Miocene	
Santiago	Borbón Formation	Middle Miocene	
Santiago Facies		Early-Mid Miocene	
	Pebas Formation	Aquitanian-Tortonian	
	Letrero Formation	Late Miocene	
	Azogues Formation	Middle Miocene	
	Daule Formation	Middle Miocene	
	San Cayetano Formation	Middle Miocene	
Nabón	Iguincha Formation	Middle Miocene	
Nabón	Latrero Formation	Middle Miocene	
	Biblián Formation	Miocene	
	Viche Formation	Langhian	
Progreso	Progreso Formation	Early-Mid Miocene	
Subibaja	Dos Bocas Formation	Chattian	
	Posojra Formation	Early-Late Oligocene	
	Zapallo Formation	Late Eocene	
Ancón	Seca Formation	Late Eocene	
Napo	Upper Napo Formation	Early Coniacian-Santonian	
Napo	Middle Napo Formation	Turonian	
Napo	Lower Napo Formation	Cenomanian	
Napo	Basal Napo Formation	Albian	
Alamor	Cazaderos Formation	Albian-Cenomanian	
	Ciano Formation	Late Aptian-Early Albian	

== See also ==
- Geology of Ecuador
- Gomphothere fossils in Ecuador
- List of fossiliferous stratigraphic units in Colombia
- List of fossiliferous stratigraphic units in Peru
- South American land mammal ages
