= Angostura Formation =

Angostura Formation may refer to:

- Angostura Colorada Formation, Late Cretaceous geologic formation of Argentina
- Angostura Formation, Chile, Early to Middle Miocene geologic formation of Chile
- Angostura Formation, Colombia, Eocene geologic formation of Colombia
- Angostura Formation, Ecuador, Late Miocene geologic formation of Ecuador
- Angostura Formation, Mexico, Late Miocene geologic formation of Mexico
