= Cazaderos Formation =

Geological formation in Ecuador

- Stratigraphic range: Albian; ~110–100 Ma
- Type: Geological formation
- Unit of: Alamor Group

Lithology
- Primary: Sandstone

Location
- Coordinates: 3.9°S 80.1°W
- Approximate paleocoordinates: 10.4°S 53.5°W
- Region: Loja Province
- Country: Ecuador

Type section
- Named for: Quebrada Cazaderos
- Cazaderos Formation (Ecuador)

The Cazaderos Formation is an Albian geologic formation in southern Ecuador.

== Fossil content ==
Fossil theropod tracks of 9 centimetres (3.5 in) in size, have been reported from the formation at the Puyango River tracksite.

== See also ==
- List of fossiliferous stratigraphic units in Ecuador
- List of dinosaur-bearing rock formations
  - List of stratigraphic units with theropod tracks
- Hiló Formation, contemporaneous fossiliferous formation of Colombia
- Itapecuru Formation, contemporaneous fossiliferous formation of the São Luis and Parnaíba Basins, Brazil
- Romualdo Formation, contemporaneous fossiliferous formation of the Araripe Basin, Brazil
- Lagarcito Formation, contemporaneous fossiliferous formation of the Marayes-El Carrizal Basin, Argentina
- Lohan Cura Formation, contemporaneous fossiliferous formation of the Neuquén Basin, Argentina
- Cerro Barcino Formation, contemporaneous fossiliferous formation of the Cañadón Asfalto Basin, Argentina
- Mata Amarilla Formation, contemporaneous fossiliferous formation of the Austral Basin, Argentina
