= Esmeraldas Formation, Ecuador =

Esmeraldas Formation
- Stratigraphic range: Early Pliocene (Montehermosan-Chapadmalalan); ~5.3–3.6 Ma
- Type: Geological formation
- Overlies: Borbón Formation

Lithology
- Primary: Mudstone
- Other: Sandstone, tuff

Location
- Coordinates: 1.0°N 79.8°W
- Approximate paleocoordinates: 0.8°N 79.0°W
- Region: Esmeraldas & Manabí Provinces
- Country: Ecuador
- Extent: Borbón Basin

Type section
- Named for: Esmeraldas
- Esmeraldas Formation, Ecuador (Ecuador)

The Esmeraldas Formation is an Early Pliocene (Montehermosan to Chapadmalalan in the SALMA classification) geologic formation of the Borbón Basin in northwestern Ecuador.

== Description ==
The bioturbated, tuffaceous, green mudstones and sometimes sandstones with small or medium-sized rounded pebbles are scattered throughout the formation, or more rarely concentrated into minor beds or seams of conglomerate. Large calcareous concretions, some rounded or with an irregular rootlike shape, generally with hollow centers are common at many places. The beds are highly foraminiferal, with pelagic types, often pure enough to form a foraminiferal ooze-like sediment. On the fresh surface of the rock platform, the formation is hard, and of a gray-black or dark olive-green color. The sediments were deposited in a deep marine environment.

== Fossil content ==
The formation has provided bivalve, gastropod, echinoid, coral, bryozoa, radiolaria, foraminifera and scaphopod fossils.

== See also ==
- List of fossiliferous stratigraphic units in Ecuador
