= Sulakocetus =

Sulakocetus Temporal range: Chattian 28.4–23.03 Ma

Scientific classification
- Kingdom: Animalia
- Phylum: Chordata
- Class: Mammalia
- Order: Artiodactyla
- Infraorder: Cetacea
- Parvorder: Odontoceti
- Family: incertae sedis
- Genus: †Sulakocetus; Mchedlidze, 1976
- Species: †S. dagestanicus

Binomial name
- †Sulakocetus dagestanicus Mchedlidze, 1976

Extinct genus of mammals

Sulakocetus is an extinct genus of toothed whale. It was first described by G.A. Mchedlidze in 1976 with the type species S. dagestanicus. Initially classified as part of family Waipatiidae, further research has called its taxonomic placement into question. A review in 1990 indicated that it should be excluded from the superfamily Platanistoidea. A further assessment in 2016 stated that it should not be classified with the Waipatiidae, and left its status for further review, essentially rendering it incertae sedis.
