= Letrero Formation =

Geologic formation in Ecuador

- Stratigraphic range: Late Miocene (Mayoan-Montehermosan); ~11.6–5.3 Ma
- Type: Geological formation

Lithology
- Primary: Siltstone
- Other: Sandstone

Location
- Coordinates: 3.3°S 79.1°W
- Approximate paleocoordinates: 3.7°S 77.4°W
- Region: Azuay Province
- Country: Ecuador
- Extent: Sierra Region
- Letrero Formation (Ecuador)

The Letrero Formation is a Late Miocene (Mayoan to Montehermosan in the SALMA classification) geologic formation in south-central Ecuador. The formation comprises lacustrine sediments with strong fluvial clastic input and contains siltstones and fine-grained sandstones.

== Fossil content ==
=== Mammals ===
Mammals of the Letrero Formation
Genus	Species	Location	Material	Notes	Images
Litopterna	Indeterminate	RHM Locality 4		A litoptern.	
Caviomorpha	Indeterminate	RHM Locality 4		A caviomorph rodent.	
Nabondasypus	Nabondasypus maddeni	Nabón basin	Several osteoderms.	An armadillo.	
Anadasypus	A. aequatorianus	RHM Locality 4		A member of cingulata.	
Toxodontia	Indeterminate	RHM Locality 4		A toxodont.	

== See also ==
- List of fossiliferous stratigraphic units in Ecuador
