= List of fossiliferous stratigraphic units in Peru =

This is a list of fossiliferous stratigraphic units in Peru.

== List of fossiliferous stratigraphic units ==
Group	Formation	Period	Notes
	La Huaca Formation	Lujanian	
	Pampa La Brea Formation	Lujanian	
	Lomas Terrace Formation	Late Pleistocene	
	Máncora Tablazo Formation	Late Pliocene-Early Pleistocene	
	Huacllaco Formation	Late Pliocene	
	La Planchada Formation	Late Pliocene	
	San Juan Terrace Formation	Late Pleistocene	
	San Sebastián Formation	Late Pleistocene	
	Taime Formation	Late Pliocene-Early Pleistocene	
	Pisco Formation	Early Miocene-Late Pliocene (Colloncuran-Chapadmalalan)	
Contamana	Madre de Dios Formation	Chasicoan-Huayquerian	
	Miramar Formation	Late Miocene (Huayquerian)	
	Tumbes Formation	Late Miocene	
	Ipururo Formation	Middle Miocene (Laventan-Montehermosan)	
	Cardalitos Formation	Middle Miocene	
	Navidad Formation	Middle Miocene	
	Camana Formation	Late Oligocene-Middle Miocene	
	Montera Formation	Early-Middle Miocene (Colhuehuapian)	
	Pebas Formation	Early-Late Miocene	
	Zorritos Formation	Early Miocene	
	Bala Formation	Santacrucian	
	Chilcatay Formation	Chattian-Burdigalian (Deseadan-Friasian)	
	Chambira Formation	Late Oligocene-Early Miocene (Deseadan)	
	Upper Moquegua Formation	Deseadan	
	Heath Formation	Late Oligocene	
	Caballas Formation	Early Eocene-Early Miocene	
	El Milagro Formation	Early Oligocene (Tinguirirican)	
	Paracas Formation	Lutetian-Priabonian (Mustersan-Divisaderan)	
	Pozo Formation	Middle Eocene-Early Oligocene (Mustersan-Divisaderan)	
	Máncora Formation	Late Eocene-Early Oligocene	
	Otuma Formation	Priabonian-Rupelian (Tinguirirican)	
	Yumaque Formation	Priabonian (Divisaderan)	
Chira	Cone Hill Formation	Priabonian	
Chira	Mirador Formation	Priabonian	
	Saman Formation	Late Eocene	
Salina	Pale Greda Formation	Lutetian	
Salina	Salina Formation	Lutetian	
	Yahuarango Formation	Mid-Late Eocene (Mustersan)	
	Restin Formation	Bartonian	
	Parinas Formation	Bartonian	
	Talara Formation	Bartonian	
	Terebratula Formation	Bartonian	
	Verdun Formation	Bartonian	
	Cajaruro Formation	Ypresian-Bartonian	
	Negritos Formation	Ypresian	
	Mogollón Formation	Itaboraian-Riochican	
	Muñani Formation	Late Paleocene-Early Eocene (Itaboraian-Riochican)	
	Chacras Formation	Early Eocene	
	Atascadero Formation	Eocene	
	Carnoas Shale	Eocene	
	Lobitos Formation	Eocene	
	Huchpayacu Formation	Paleocene	
	Couches Rouges Formation	Paleogene	
	Monte Grande Formation	Maastrichtian	
	Radiolite Sandstone	Maastrichtian	
	El Cenizo Formation	Early Maastrichtian	
	La Tortuga Formation	Early Maastrichtian	
Vilquechico	Upper Vilquechico Formation	Late Campanian-Maastrichtian	
	Chota Formation	Campanian-Maastrichtian	
	La Mesa Formation	Campanian	
	Chonta Formation	Albian-Coniacian	
	Vivián Formation	Santonian-Campanian	
	Celendín Formation	Coniacian-Santonian	
	Cajamarca Formation	Turonian	
Quillquiñán	Coñor Formation	Turonian	
Quillquiñán	Romirón Formation	Cenomanian	
	Oriente Formation	Albian-Turonian	
Pulluicana	Mujarrún Formation	Late Cenomanian	
Pulluicana	Yumagual Formation	Late Albian-Cenomanian	
	Raya Formation	Albian-Cenomanian	
	Crisnejas Formation	Early-Mid Albian	
	Chulec Formation	Albian	
	Inca Formation	Albian	
	Pariatambo Formation	Albian	
	Agua Caliente Formation	Aptian-Albian	
	Esperanza Formation	Aptian	
Yura	Hualhuani Formation	Early Cretaceous	
Lima	Atocongo Formation	Late Hauterivian-Early Barremian	
	Carhuaz Formation	Valanginian-Barremian	
	Santa Formation	Valanginian	
Chicama	Punta Moreno Formation	Late Tithonian	
Chicama	Sapotal Formation	Late Tithonian	
	Chocolate Formation	Sinemurian	
Pucara	Condorsinga Formation	Sinemurian	
Pucara	Aramachay Formation	Hettangian	
Pucara	Chambara Formation	Norian	
Mitu		Artinskian-Kungurian	
	Copacabana Formation	Permian	
Tarma		Bashkirian-Moscovian	
	Ambo Formation	Viséan	
	Cocachacra Shale	Early Devonian	
	Lampa Formation	Silurian-Early Devonian	
	Calapuja Formation	Sandbian	
	Contaya Formation	Darriwilian	
	San José Formation	Floian	

== See also ==
- List of fossiliferous stratigraphic units in Bolivia
- List of fossiliferous stratigraphic units in Colombia
- List of fossiliferous stratigraphic units in Ecuador
- Geology of Peru
- South American land mammal age
- Gomphothere fossils in Peru
