= Onzole Formation =

- Stratigraphic range: Early Pliocene (Montehermosan-Chapadmalalan); ~5.3–3.6 Ma
- Type: Geological formation
- Unit of: Daule Group
- Sub-units: Súa & Esmeraldas Members
- Overlies: Angostura Formation

Lithology
- Primary: Shale
- Other: Mudstone

Location
- Coordinates: 1.0°N 79.6°W
- Approximate paleocoordinates: 0.8°N 78.8°W
- Region: Esmeraldas Province
- Country: Ecuador
- Extent: Borbón Basin

Type section
- Named for: Onzole River
- Onzole Formation (Ecuador)

The Onzole Formation is an Early Pliocene (Montehermosan to Chapadmalalan in the SALMA classification) geologic formation in the Borbón Basin of northwestern Ecuador. The formation consists of a shallow marine sandstone member containing many fish fossils, among which megalodon, and a deep water member comprising tuffaceous shales and mudstones containing gastropods, bivalves and scaphopods.

== Subdivision ==
The formation consists of the Esmeraldas Member, which is a unit comprising highly foraminiferal tuffaceous calcareous shale. They were deposited by shallow water gravity flows, which brought the Esmeraldas fauna into the deep water (1,000 metres (3,300 ft)) from shallow water, on the order of 75 metres (246 ft).

The Esmeraldas Member is covered by the Súa Member comprising burrowed, bioturbated, silty sandstones deposited in a coastal environment.

== Fossil content ==
The formation has provided bivalve, gastropod, and scaphopod fossils and the following vertebrates:

- Carcharhinus egertoni, C. priscus
- Carcharocles megalodon
- Diaphus ecuadorensis
- Galeocerdo aduncus
- Hemipristis serra
- Isistius triangulus
- Negaprion eurybathrodon
- Odontaspis acutissima
- Rhizoprionodon taxandriae
- Brotula cf. ordwayi
- Chilara taylori
- Eucinostomus cf. currani
- Larimus cf. pacificus
- Lepophidium borbonensis, L. limulum
- Lepophidium microlepis
- Merluccius cf. angustimanus
- Orthopristis cf. cantharinus
- Otophidium indefatigabile
- Paraconger californiensis
- Porichthys analis, Porichthys margaritatus, Porichthys cf. notatus
- Stellifer onzole
- Anchoa sp.
- Apogon sp.
- Citharichthys sp.
- Diaphus sp.
- Haemulon sp.
- Lampadena sp.
- Apogonidae indet.
- Cynoglossidae indet.
- Gobiidae indet.
- Gerreidae indet.
- Opistognathidae indet.
- Pleuronectidae indet.
- ?Serranidae indet.

== See also ==
- List of fossiliferous stratigraphic units in Ecuador
