= Viche Formation =

- Stratigraphic range: Langhian (Friasian-Colloncuran); ~16–13.7 Ma
- Type: Geological formation
- Underlies: Angostura Formation

Lithology
- Primary: Siltstone
- Other: Claystone

Location
- Coordinates: 1.1°N 79.2°W
- Approximate paleocoordinates: 0.3°N 76.1°W
- Region: Esmeraldas Province
- Country: Ecuador
- Extent: Borbón Basin

Type section
- Named for: Viche, traditional fish dish
- Viche Formation (Ecuador)

The Viche Formation is a Langhian (Friasian to Colloncuran in the SALMA classification) geologic formation of the Borbón Basin in northwestern Ecuador. The formation underlies the Angostura Formation. Fossils of Ziphiidae indet. have been found in the formation.

== See also ==
- List of fossiliferous stratigraphic units in Ecuador
