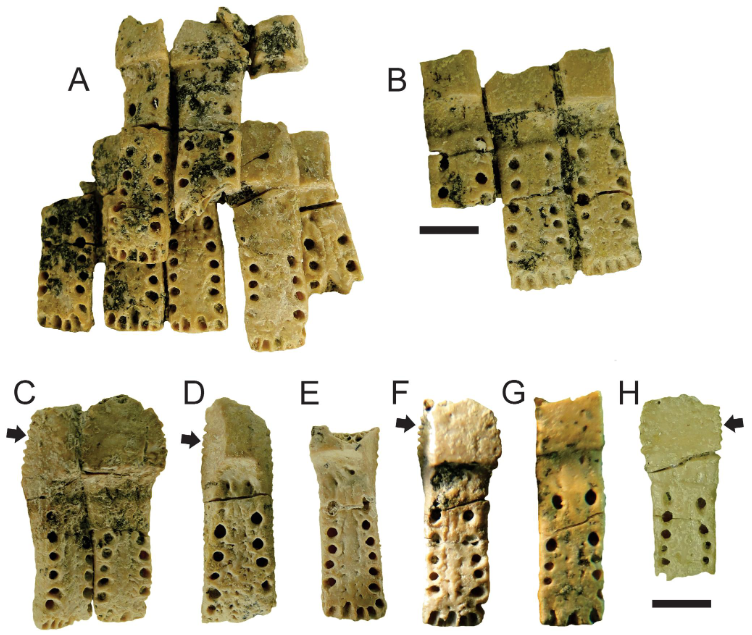
- Mobile osteoderms of the holotype

Scientific classification
- Kingdom: Animalia
- Phylum: Chordata
- Class: Mammalia
- Order: Cingulata
- Family: Dasypodidae
- Tribe: Dasypodini
- Genus: †Nabondasypus; Barasoain et al., 2026
- Species: †N. maddeni

Binomial name
- †Nabondasypus maddeni Barasoain et al., 2026

= Nabondasypus =

Nabondasypus Temporal range: Late Miocene (Tortonian), ~9 Ma

Extinct mammal genus

Nabondasypus (lit. 'Nabón Basin Dasypus') is an extinct genus of armadillo in the family Dasypodidae. It is known from fossils found in the Late Miocene (Tortonian age, ~9 million years ago) Letrero Formation of Ecuador. The genus contains a single species, Nabondasypus maddeni, known from several osteoderms. An arrangement of foramina on some of these pieces of the armor carapace likely held glands that correspond to hair follicles, suggesting Nabondasypus may have had an unusual coat of hair over the shell's mobile bands.

== Discovery and naming ==
The Nabondasypus fossil material was discovered in 2019 in outcrops of the Letrero Formation in the Nabón Basin of Azuay Province, Ecuador. The specimen is housed in the Paleontology Collection of the National Polytechnic School in Ecuador, where it is accessioned as specimen EPNPv-6381. It consists of several osteoderms (bony plates forming the characteristic bands of the armored shell on the animal's back). Fixed and mobile osteoderms are known, all belonging to a single individual.

In 2026, Daniel Barasoain and colleagues described Nabondasypus maddeni as a new genus and species of dasypodid armadillo based on these fossil remains, establishing EPNPv-6381 as the holotype specimen. The generic name, Nabondasypus, combines a reference to both the type locality (Nabón Basin) and the related extant (living) genus Dasypus, which is the only living dasypodid. The specific name, maddeni, honors Richard H. Madden and his research on tropical South American vertebrate fossils.

== Description ==
Nabondasypus is regarded as a small member of the subfamily Dasypodinae. The osteoderms are rectangular. The dorsal (outside-facing) surfaces of the fixed osteoderms (those forming the rigid part of the carapace) are very rough and are covered in an ornamentation pattern. The proportion of the central figure of each osteoderm is more similar to Plesiodasypus than other dasypodines. The mobile osteoderms (those forming the flexible bands in the center of the carapace) are longer than those of Plesiodasypus. The regions of these osteoderms that articulate with their corresponding elements have a prominently denticulate pattern, distinct from all other armadillos.

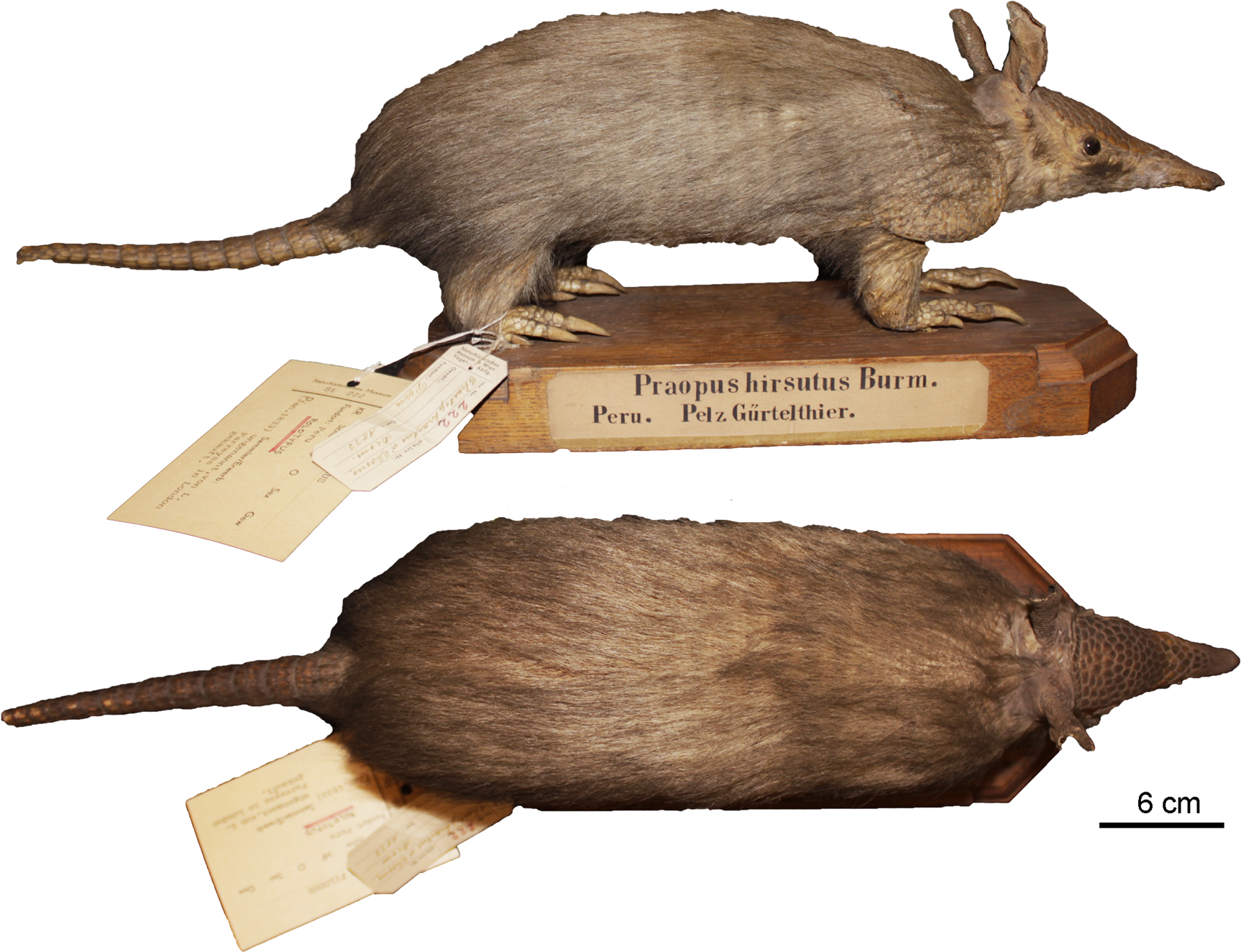
Mounted holotype of the modern hairy long-nosed armadillo, with which Nabondasypus may have had comparable integument

The mobile osteoderms of Nabondasypus are covered in two parallel rows of large foramina (holes), which are connected to glandular cavities in the bone. These are somewhat reminiscent of the osteoderms of the modern hairy long-nosed armadillo (Dasypus pilosus), although in this species the foramina are less organized and are present on both mobile and fixed osteoderms. In this extant species, the foramina are associated with thick hairs. The glandular cavities seen in Nabondasypus likely housed the sebaceous and sweat glands corresponding to hair follicles. Barasoain and colleagues speculated that Nabondasypus may have borne a coat of hair exclusively over the carapace's mobile bands, which would be unique for an armadillo.

== Classification ==
To test the affinities and relationships of Nabondasypus, Barasoain et al. (2026) included it in an updated version of the phylogenetic matrix of Barasoain et al. (2024), which includes 21 extinct and 12 extant species. Nabondasypus was recovered in a basal position within the Dasypodinae, a subfamily in the armadillo family Dasypodidae. These results are displayed in the cladogram below:

- - Chlamyphoridae
  - Dasypodidae
    - †Stegotheriinae
    - Dasypodinae
      - †Plesiodasypus
      - - †Nabondasypus
        - - †Anadasypus spp.
          - - †Propraopus
            - ⊞ Dasypus spp.
              - Dasypus pilosus (hairy long-nosed armadillo)
              - - †Dasypus bellus
                - Dasypus novemcinctus (nine-banded armadillo)
              ⊟
