= Dos Bocas Formation =

- Stratigraphic range: Chattian (Deseadan); ~26–24 Ma
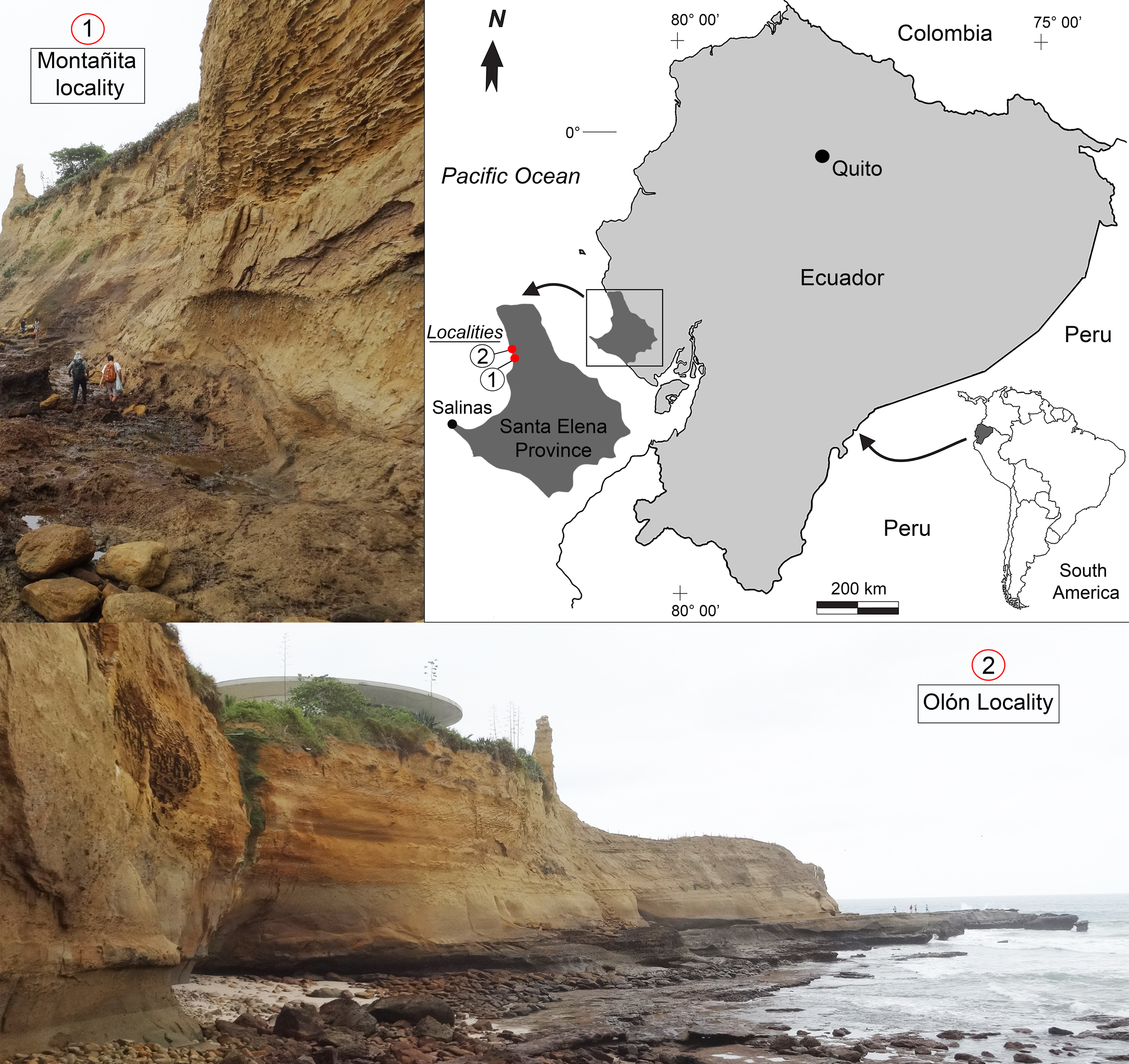
- Montañita-Olón locality with outcrops of the Dos Bocas Formation
- Type: Geological formation
- Unit of: Subibaja Group
- Underlies: Villingota Formation
- Overlies: Zapotal Formation

Lithology
- Primary: Sandstone

Location
- Coordinates: 1.8°S 80.8°W
- Approximate paleocoordinates: 3.6°S 75.5°W
- Region: Santa Elena Province
- Country: Ecuador
- Extent: Progreso Basin

The Dos Bocas Formation is a sedimentary geological formation of the Progreso Basin in southwestern Ecuador. It is dated to the Chattian, about 26 to 24 Ma, (Deseadan in the SALMA classification).

== Description ==
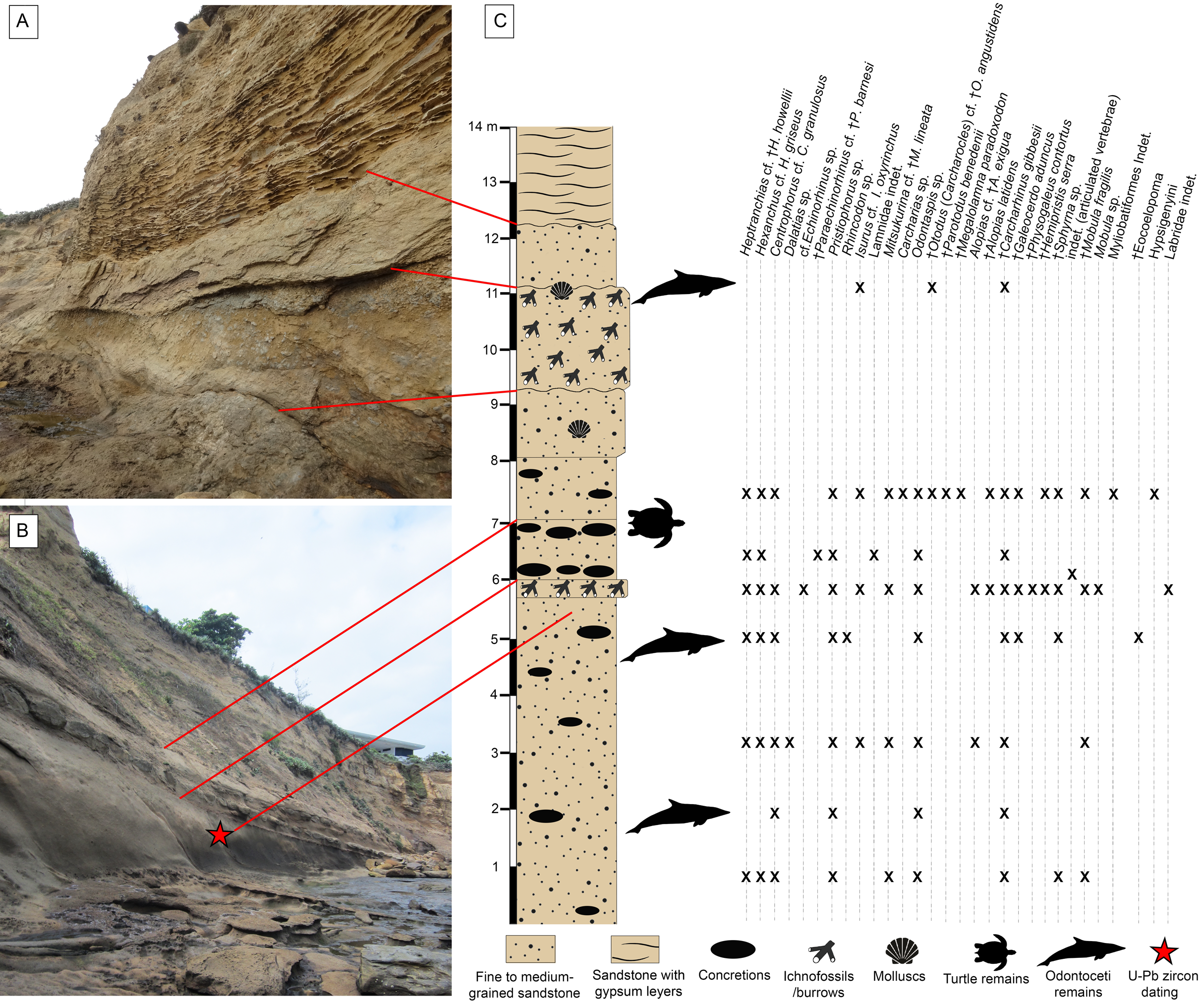
Stratigraphy of the Montañita-Olón locality

The formation comprises moderately-sorted, fine to medium sandstones with angular quartz-feldspathic clasts. Conspicuous rounded green grains are probably glauconite, but berthierine cannot be dismissed. The matrix is micritic and volcanogenic, possibly bentonitic. The formation was deposited in an estuarine to mid shelf environment. Fossils of sharks, turtles, variety of fish and the tropical dolphin Urkudelphis were recovered from the formation.

== Fossil content ==
The formation has provided fossils of marine animals:

- Carcharocles angustidens.
- Urkudelphis chawpipacha.
- Pancheloniidae indet.

== See also ==
- List of fossiliferous stratigraphic units in Ecuador
- Bahía Inglesa Formation
- Coquimbo Formation
- Pisco Formation
