= Cangahua Formation =

Geologic formation in Ecuador

- Stratigraphic range: Late Pleistocene (Lujanian); ~0.8–0.011 Ma
- Type: Geological formation

Location
- Coordinates: 0.2°N 78.5°W
- Region: Pichincha Province
- Country: Ecuador
- Extent: Sierra Region

Type section
- Named for: Cangahua, a local name for adobe.
- Cangahua Formation (Ecuador)

The Cangahua Formation is a Late Pleistocene (Lujanian in the SALMA classification) geologic formation of the Pichincha Province in north-central Ecuador.

== Fossil content ==
The formation has provided beetle fossils of the species:

- Coprinisphaera ecuadoriensis
- Phanaeus violetae

== See also ==
- List of fossiliferous stratigraphic units in Ecuador
