= Angostura Formation, Ecuador =

Geologic formation in Ecuador

Angostura Formation
- Stratigraphic range: Late Miocene (Mayoan-Montehermosan); ~11.6–5.3 Ma
- Type: Geological formation
- Unit of: Santiago Group
- Underlies: Onzole Formation
- Overlies: Viche Formation
- Thickness: 150 m (490 ft)

Lithology
- Primary: Sandstone
- Other: Conglomerate

Location
- Coordinates: 1.0°N 79.6°W
- Approximate paleocoordinates: 0.6°N 78.0°W
- Region: Esmeraldas Province
- Country: Ecuador
- Extent: Borbón Basin
- Angostura Formation, Ecuador (Ecuador)

The Angostura Formation is a Late Miocene (Mayoan to Montehermosan in the SALMA classification) geologic formation of the Borbón Basin in northwestern Ecuador.

== Description ==
The coarse sandstones and beds of conglomerates, about 150 metres (490 ft) in thickness. The formation is resistant to erosion and is largely barren, but at a few places there are lenses or interbeds filled with finely preserved fossils. The formation overlies the Viche Formation, and is overlain by the lower Onzole Formation. The Angostura Formation is time-equivalent with the fossiliferous Gatún Formation of Panama.

== Fossil content ==
The formation has provided bivalve and gastropod fossils.

== See also ==
- List of fossiliferous stratigraphic units in Ecuador
