= Papahu =

Papahu Temporal range: Aquitanian–Burdigalian

Scientific classification
- Kingdom: Animalia
- Phylum: Chordata
- Class: Mammalia
- Infraclass: Placentalia
- Order: Artiodactyla
- Infraorder: Cetacea
- Parvorder: Odontoceti
- Genus: †Papahu
- Species: †P. taitapu

Binomial name
- †Papahu taitapu Aguirre-Fernández and Fordyce, 2014

Extinct genus of odontocete

Papahu is an extinct monotypic genus of toothed whale that lived in the oceans around Zealandia during the Aquitanian and Burdigalian stages of the Early Miocene.

== Etymology ==
The generic name Papahu stems from the Māori noun pāpahu, meaning dolphin. The specific epithet of the type species, Papahu taitapu, is derived from Te Tai Tapu, the Māori term for the northwestern coast of the South Island of New Zealand.
