= Matina, Bahia =

Municipality in Bahia, Brazil

Matina
- Municipality
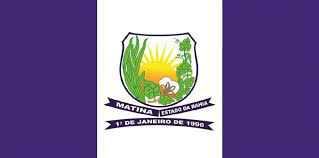
- Flag Coat of arms

- Location of Matina
- Coordinates: 13°54′0″S 42°50′56″W
- Country: Brazil
- State: Bahia

Population (2020)
  - Total: 12,283
- Time zone: UTC−3 (BRT)

Matina is a municipality in the Brazilian state of Bahia.
