= Quaternary International =

- Discipline: Quaternary science
- Language: English
- Edited by: Min-Te Chen

Publication details
- History: 1989-present
- Publisher: Elsevier
- Frequency: 36/year
- Impact factor: 2.199 (2016)

Standard abbreviations
- ISO 4: Quat. Int.

Indexing
- CODEN: QUINER
- ISSN: 1040-6182
- LCCN: 90660977
- OCLC no.: 18471518

Links
- Journal homepage; Online access

Quaternary International is a peer-reviewed scientific journal on quaternary science published by Elsevier on behalf of the International Union for Quaternary Research. The journal was established in 1989 and covers full spectrum of the physical and natural sciences that are commonly employed in solving problems related to the quaternary period. The editor-in-chief is Min-Te Chen (National Taiwan Ocean University).

According to the 2017 Journal Citation Reports, the journal has a 2016 impact factor of 2.199.
