= Tablazo Formation, Ecuador =

Geologic formation in Ecuador

Tablazo Formation
- Stratigraphic range: Mid Pleistocene (Lujanian); ~0.8–0.2 Ma
- Type: Geological formation

Lithology
- Primary: Claystone, sandstone

Location
- Coordinates: 1.2°S 80.8°W
- Region: Santa Elena Province
- Country: Ecuador

Type section
- Named for: Cerro El Tablazo
- Tablazo Formation, Ecuador (Ecuador)

The Tablazo Formation is a Middle Pleistocene geologic formation of Santa Elena Province in western Ecuador. The claystones and sandstones were deposited in an estuarine environment.

== Fossil content ==
The formation has provided the following fossils:

- Geochelone sp.
- Eremotherium cf. laurillardi
- Notiomastodon platensis (described as Haplomastodon waringii)
- Smilodon fatalis

An association of two subadult and one adult specimen of Smilodon fatalis was reported from the formation by Reynolds, Seymour & Evans (2021), who interpret the subadult specimens as likely to be siblings, and evaluate the implications of this finding for the knowledge of the life history of S. fatalis.

== See also ==
- List of fossiliferous stratigraphic units in Ecuador
