= Urkudelphis =

Urkudelphis Temporal range: Late Oligocene (Deseadan) ~34–23 Ma

Scientific classification
- Kingdom: Animalia
- Phylum: Chordata
- Class: Mammalia
- Order: Artiodactyla
- Infraorder: Cetacea
- Genus: †Urkudelphis; Tanaka et al. 2017
- Species: †U. chawpipacha

Binomial name
- †Urkudelphis chawpipacha Tanaka et al. 2017

Extinct genus of Oligocene tropical dolphin

Urkudelphis is an extinct genus of cetacean endemic to Ecuador, a tropical dolphin small in size . The type species, Urkudelphis chawpipacha, was described in 2017 based in a single skull of a juvenile and auditory bones in the Dos Bocas Formation of Ecuador. It was an ancestor of river dolphins It is also one of the only dolphin fossils in tropical waters.
