= Ediscetus =

Ediscetus Temporal range: Early Oligocene

Scientific classification
- Kingdom: Animalia
- Phylum: Chordata
- Class: Mammalia
- Infraclass: Placentalia
- Order: Artiodactyla
- Infraorder: Cetacea
- Parvorder: Odontoceti
- Genus: †Ediscetus
- Species: †E. osbornei

Binomial name
- †Ediscetus osbornei Albright et al., 2018

Extinct genus of aquatic mammals

Ediscetus is an extinct genus of cetacean that inhabited South Carolina during the Rupelian. It contains the species E. osbornei.
