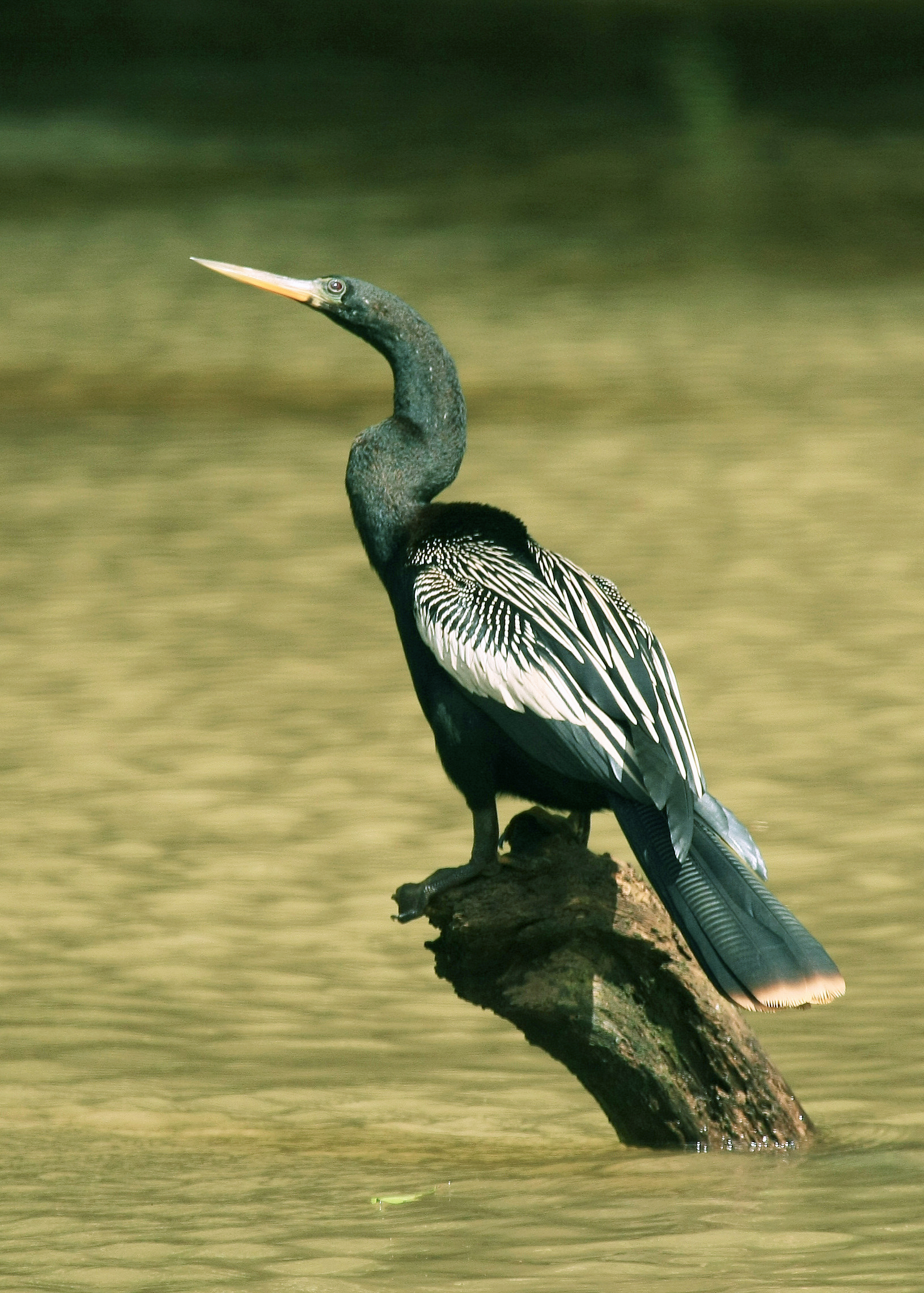
- Male in Costa Rica
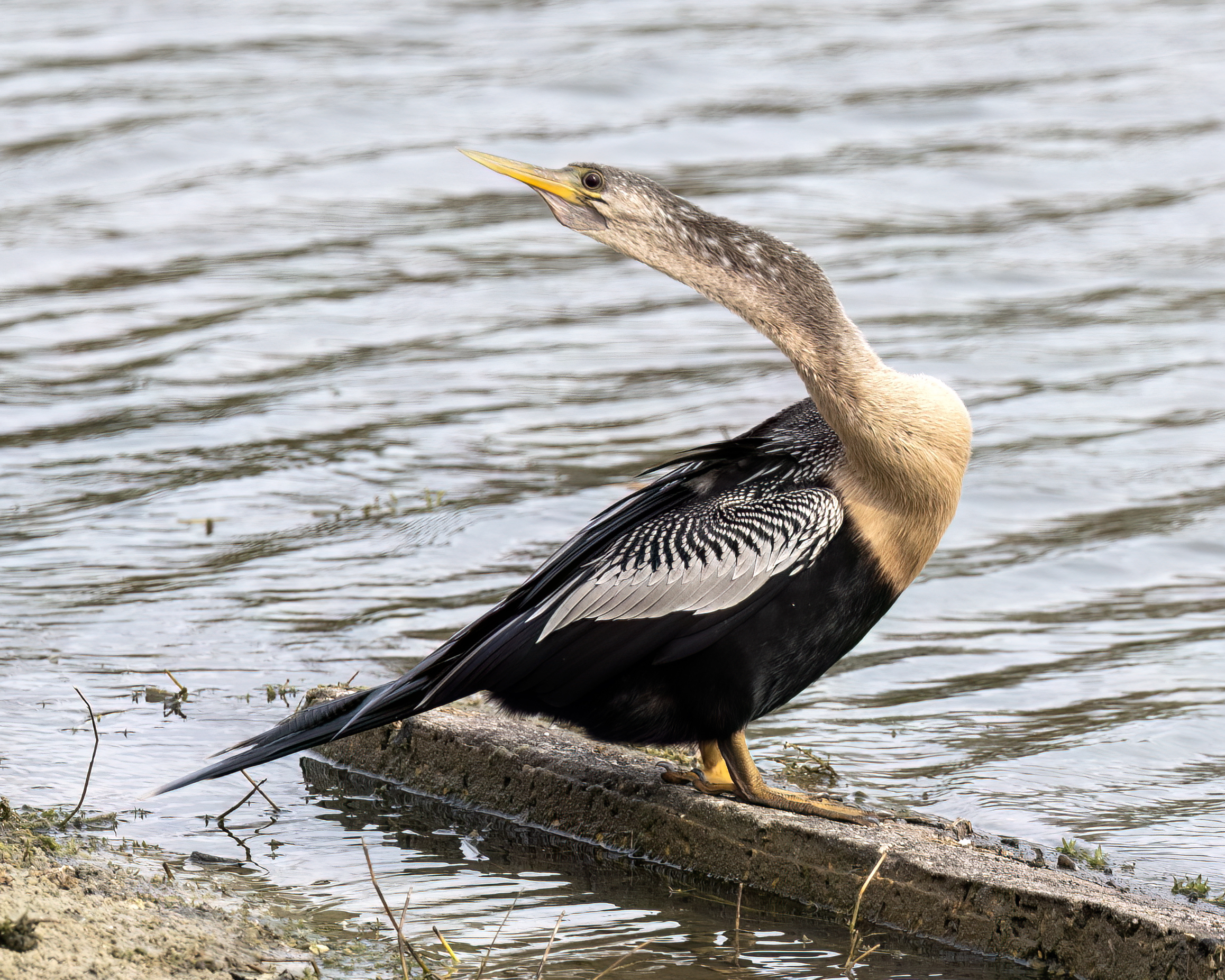
- Female in Tampa, Florida

Conservation status
- Least Concern (IUCN 3.1)

- Secure (NatureServe)

Scientific classification
- Kingdom: Animalia
- Phylum: Chordata
- Class: Aves
- Order: Suliformes
- Family: Anhingidae
- Genus: Anhinga
- Species: A. anhinga

Binomial name
- Anhinga anhinga (Linnaeus, 1766)

Subspecies
- A. a. anhinga A. a. leucogaster
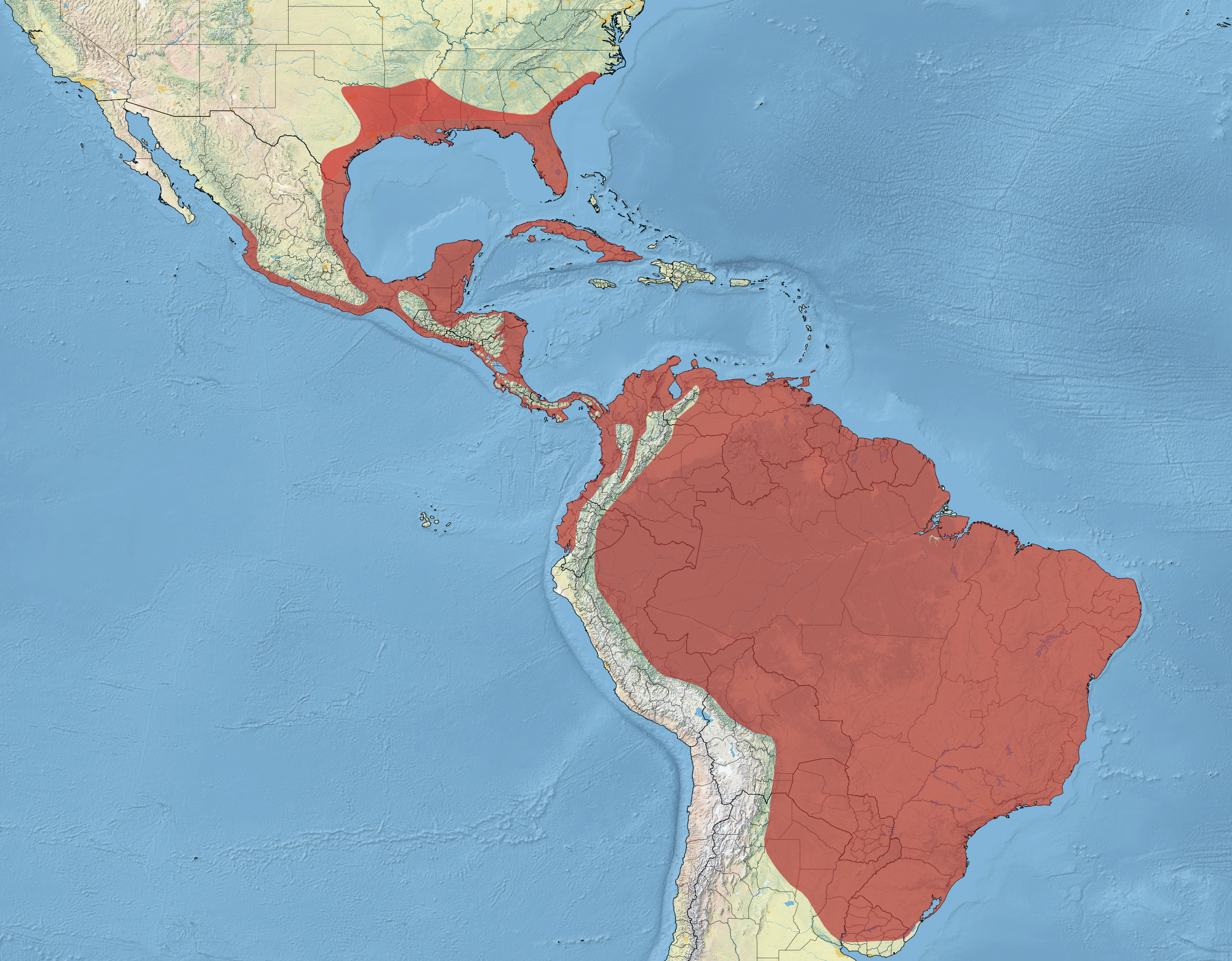
- Range of A. anhinga Breeding range Resident range

Synonyms
- Plotus anhinga Linnaeus, 1766

= Anhinga =

Anhinga Temporal range: Pleistocene–present

Species of bird

The anhinga (/ænˈhɪŋɡə/; Anhinga anhinga), sometimes called darter, American darter, snakebird, or water turkey, is a water bird of the warmer parts of the Americas. The word anhinga comes from a'ñinga in the Brazilian Tupi language and means "devil bird" or "snake bird". The origin of the name is apparent when swimming: only the neck appears above water, so the bird looks like a snake ready to strike. They do not have external nares (nostrils) and breathe solely through their epiglottis, via small opercula at the corners of the beak.

The anhinga is placed in the darter family, Anhingidae, and is closely related to the Oriental (Anhinga melanogaster), African (Anhinga rufa), and Australasian (Anhinga novaehollandiae) darters. Like other darters, the anhinga hunts by spearing fish and other small prey using its sharp, slender beak.

== Distribution and migration ==
Members of the Anhinga genus live in warm, shallow waters and swamplands worldwide. The American anhinga has been subdivided into two subspecies, A. a. anhinga and A. a. leucogaster, based on their respective location. A. a. anhinga can be found mainly east of the Andes in South America, east to the islands of Trinidad and Tobago. A. a. leucogaster can be found in the southern United States, Mexico, Cuba, and the Caribbean island of Grenada. A fossil species, Anhinga walterbolesi, has been described from the Late Oligocene to Early Miocene of Australia.

Only birds living in the extreme north or south of their respective ranges will migrate based on temperature and available sunlight; anhingas will travel closer towards the equator during winter, but this range is "determined by the amount of sunshine to warm the chilled birds". Although not part of their traditional range, American anhingas have been found as far north as the states of Pennsylvania, Wisconsin, and New York.

Kettles of anhingas often migrate with other species of birds, and have been described as resembling "black paper gliders".

== Description ==
The anhinga is a large bird, measuring approximately 89 cm (35 in) in length (with a range of 75–95 cm (30–37 in)), with a 1.14 m (3.7 ft) wingspan. The A. a. anhinga subspecies is larger than A. a. leucogaster and has broader buffy tail tips. They weigh on average around 1.22 kg (2.7 lb), with a range of 1.04–1.35 kg (2.3–3.0 lb). The bill is relatively long (about twice the length of the head), sharply pointed, and yellow, and the webbed feet are yellow as well.

The male is glossy black-green, including its wings and the base of its wings, while its tail is glossy black-blue. The tip of the tail is white. The back of the head and the neck have elongated feathers that have been described as gray or light purple-white. The upper back of the body and wings are spotted or streaked with white.

The female anhinga is similar to the male except for its pale gray-buff or light brown head, neck, and upper chest. The lower chest or breast is a chestnut color, and the back is browner than the male's.

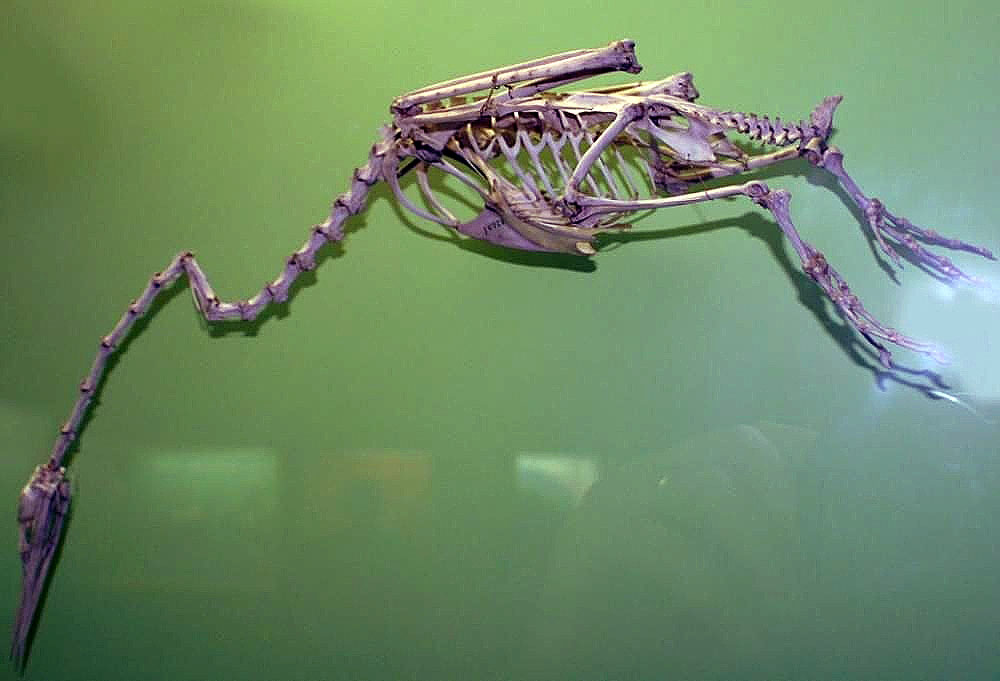
Skeleton, showing the hinge-like articulation between the eighth and ninth cervical vertebrae.

The hatchling starts bald but gains tan down within a few days of hatching. Within two weeks, the tan down is replaced by white down. Three weeks after hatching, the first juvenile feathers appear. Juveniles are mostly brown until they first breed, usually after the second or third winter.

Anhinga are similar in size, shape, and behavior to the double-crested cormorant. The two species can be differentiated by their tails, bills, and flight. The tail of the anhinga is wider and longer, only the cormorant's bill has a hook-tip, only the anhinga can glide in flight.

Typical of the genus, anhingas have a "kinked" neck due to the unique "hinge" morphology of the joint between the eighth and ninth cervical vertebrae.

== Behavior ==
Anhingas swim underwater by kicking their webbed feet to pursue their prey, fish or amphibians, which they spear by rapidly outstretching their bent neck. They come up to the surface to consume and swallow prey. Unlike ducks, ospreys and pelicans, which coat their feathers with oils from the uropygial gland, the anhinga does not have this ability; anhingas lack waterproof feathers on their bodies, causing them to be saturated upon immersion into water, while the flight feathers are slightly less wettable. Thus, their habit of basking in the sun with outstretched wings is crucial. Their dense bones, wetted plumage, and neutral buoyancy in water allow them to fully submerge and hunt for underwater prey.

Anhingas cannot fly for any extended distance with soaked feathers; if they attempt to fly while wet, notable difficulty is experienced, the birds flapping vigorously while "running" on the water's surface for a short distance (often escaping a perceived threat). Like cormorants, anhingas perch and rest on fallen trees, logs or rocks near the water's edge with wings spread and feathers fanned-open in a semicircular shape, facing away from the sun, in order to dry themselves and absorb the sun's heat. Anhingas also lose body heat relatively fast, and their posture helps them absorb solar radiation from the sun to counteract this. Because an anhinga in the drying position resembles a male turkey, it has been colloquially referred to as the 'water turkey' or 'swamp turkey'. The species is also called the "water turkey" because its long, fanlike tail resembles a turkey's tail.

== Diet ==
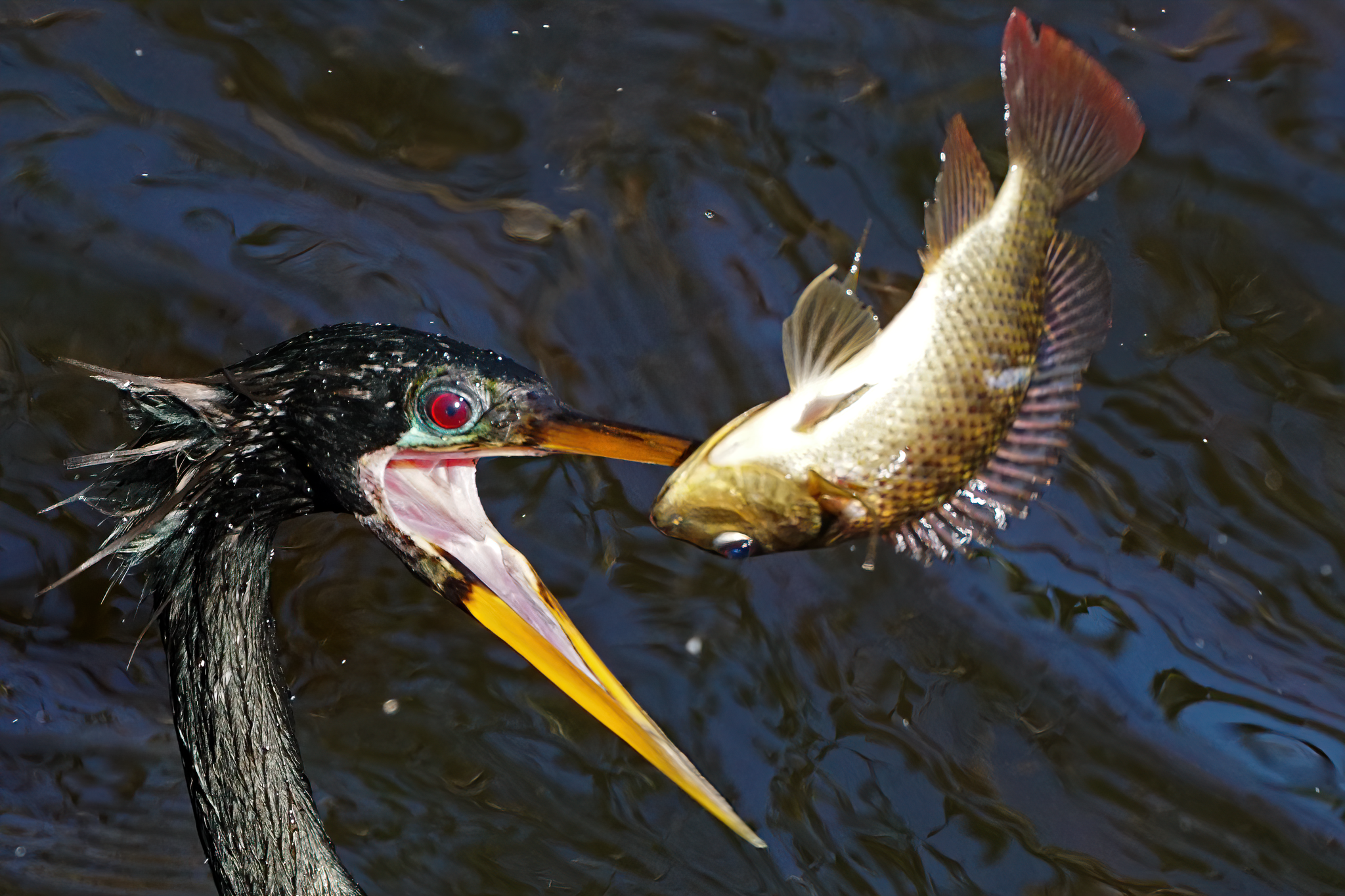
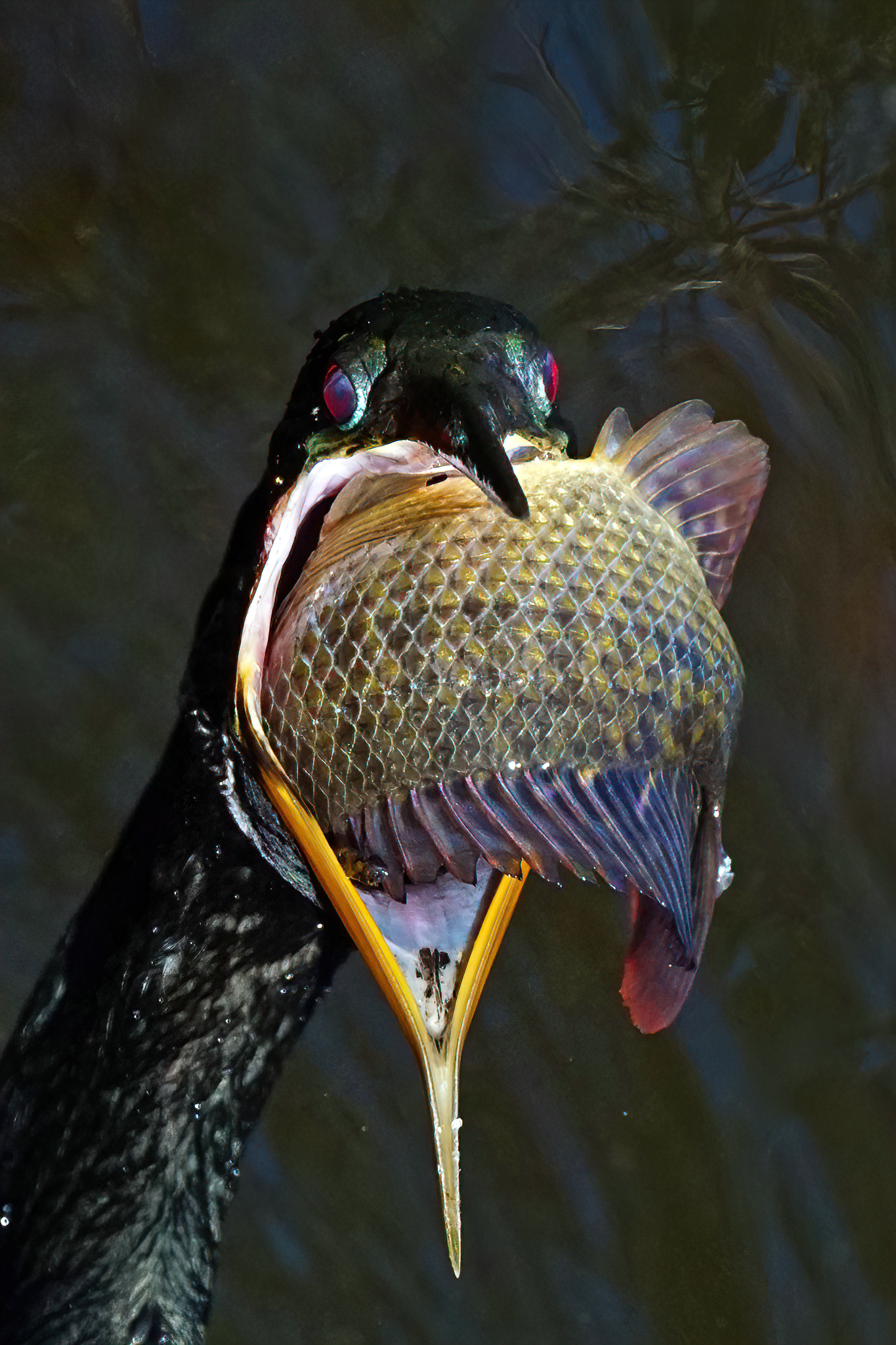
Eating a cichlid.

Anhingas feed on moderately sized wetland fishes, amphibians, aquatic invertebrates and insects. In Alabama, the anhinga's diet consists of fishes (such as mullet, sunfish, black bass, catfish, suckers, and chain pickerel), crayfish, crabs, shrimp, aquatic insects, tadpoles, water snakes and small terrapins. In Florida, sunfishes and bass, killifishes, and live-bearing fishes are primarily eaten by the anhingas. Other fish eaten include pupfish and percids.

Anhingas stalk fish underwater, mainly where there is some vegetation. Once they locate their prey, they partly open their bill and stab the fish swiftly. For larger fish, they use both their jaws; for small fish, they may use only the lower jaw. If the fish is too large to forage, the anhinga stabs it repeatedly and then lets it go. Anhingas bring their capture to the surface of the water, toss it backward and engulf it head-first.

== Conservation status ==
The US protects the anhinga under the Migratory Bird Treaty Act of 1918. The number of individual anhingas has not been estimated, but they are considered to be of least concern because of the frequency of their occurrence in their 15,000,000 km^{2} (5,800,000 sq mi) global range.

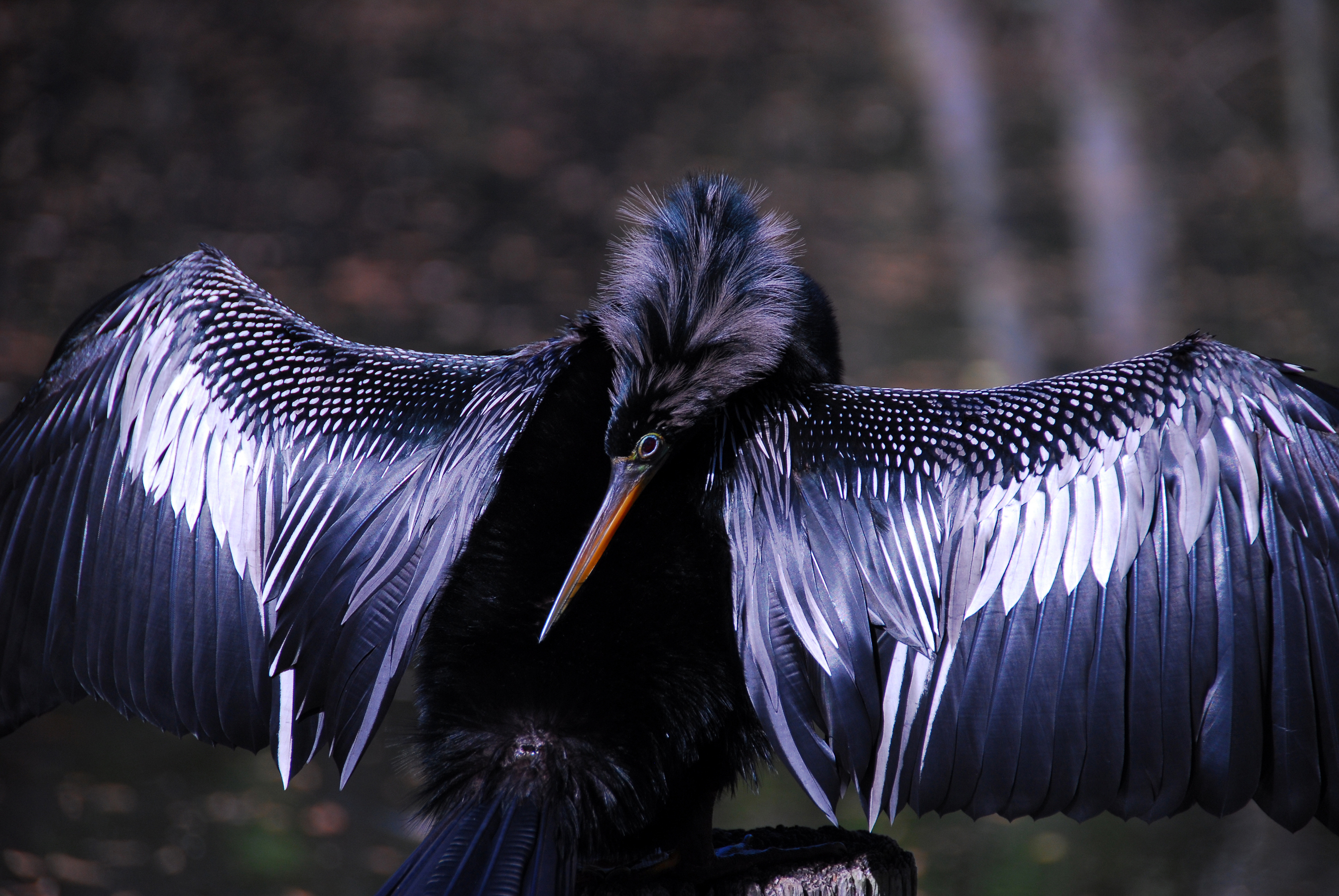
Male drying its feathers and warming its body, Florida, US

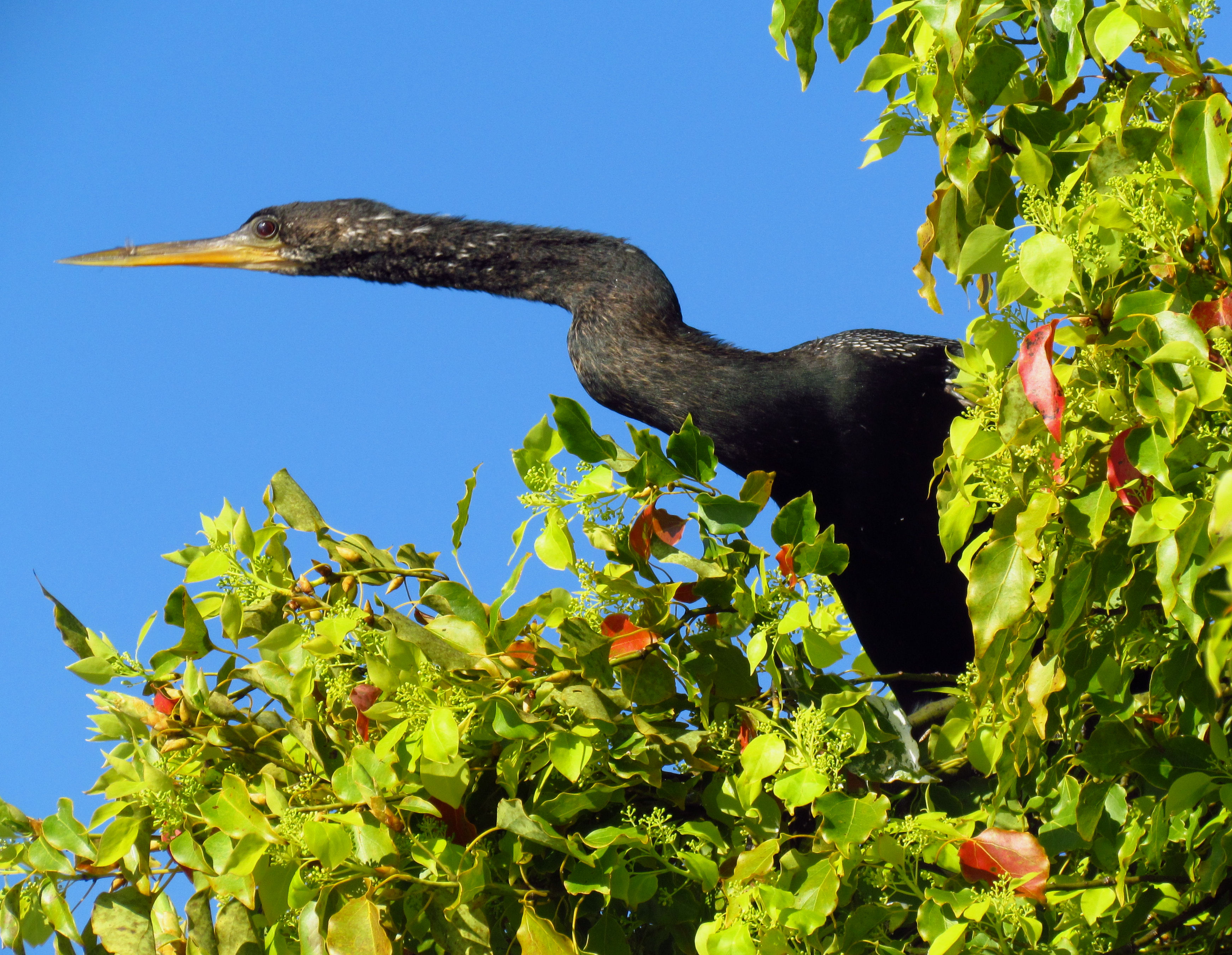
Showing snake-like neck and pointed beak

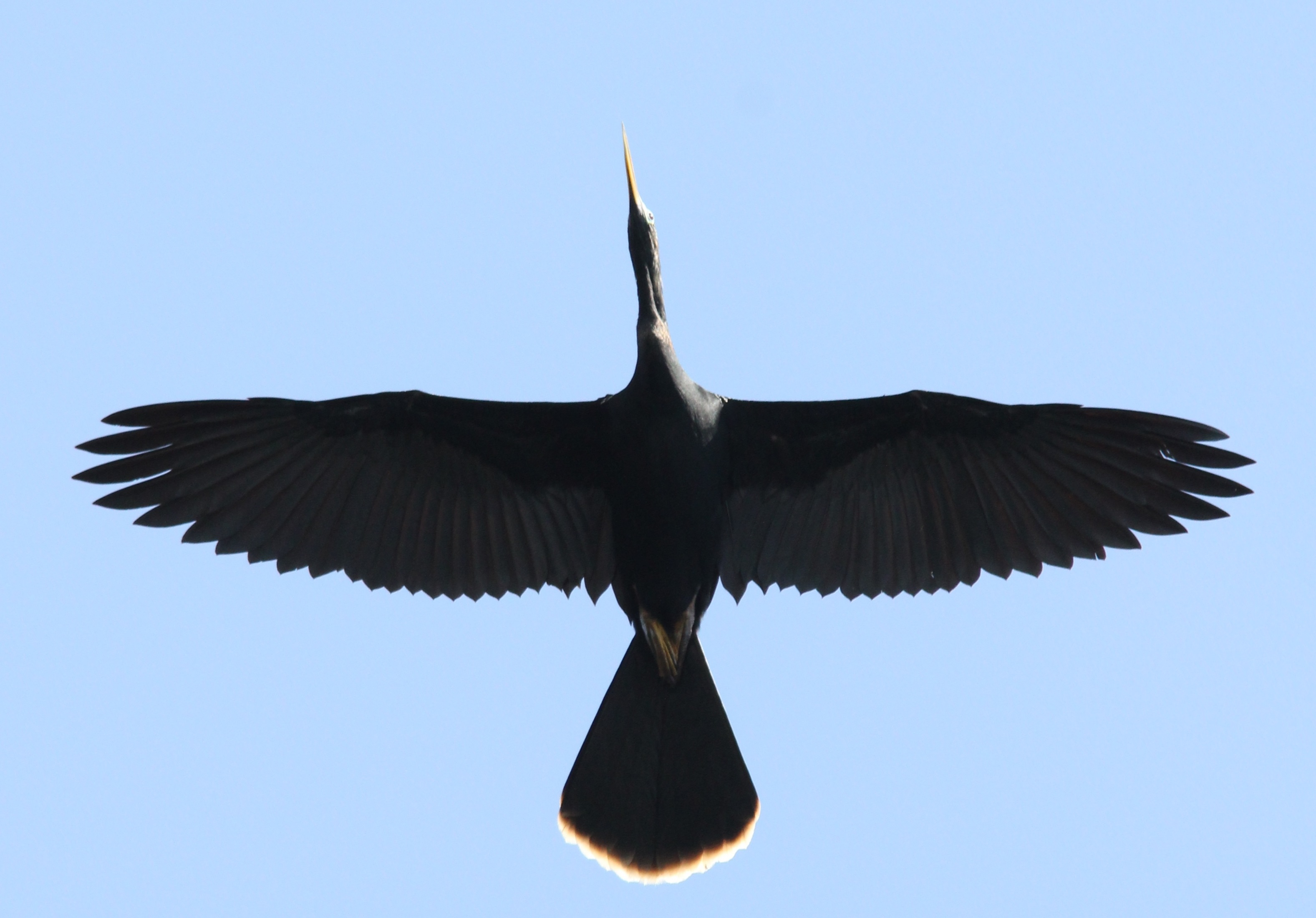
Male in flight at Crystal River, Florida, US

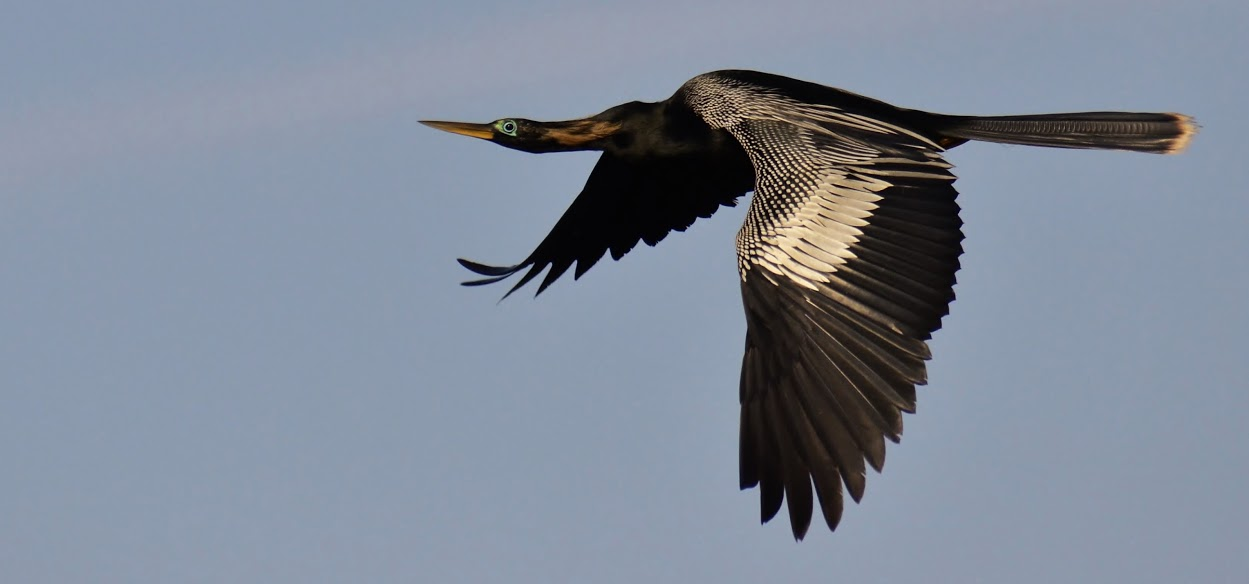
Male in flight, South Carolina, US

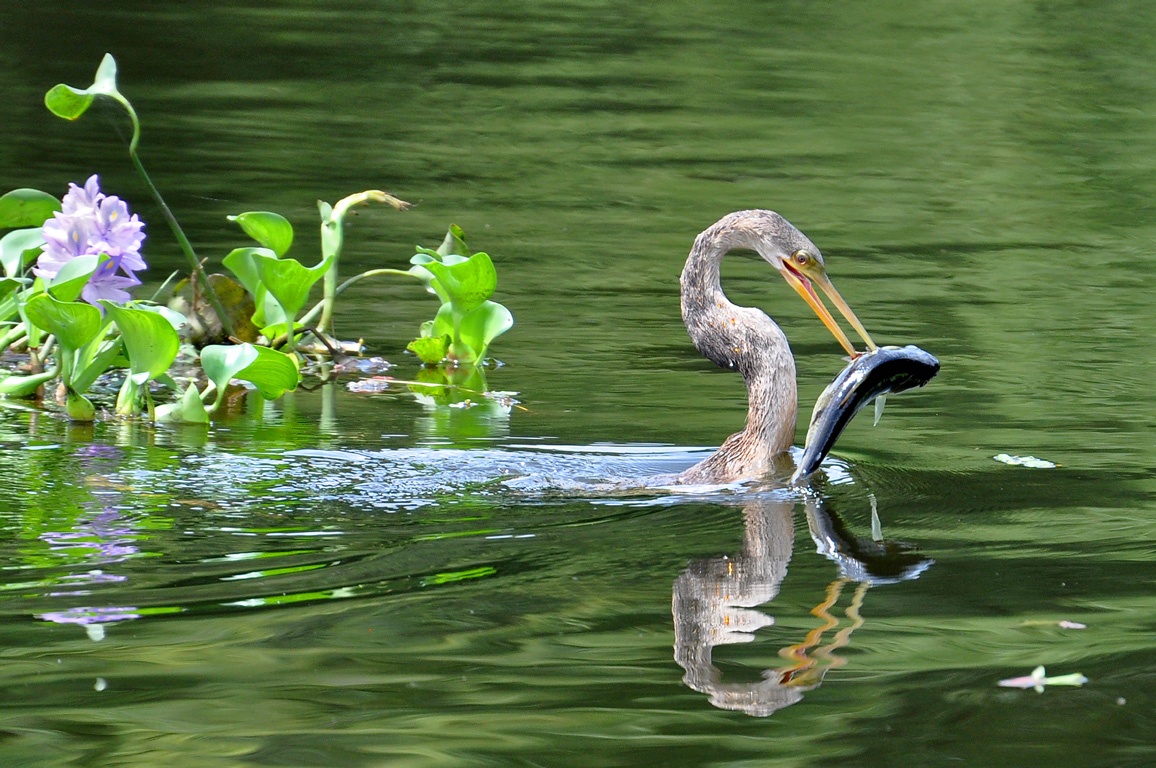
Juvenile in Uarini, Amazonas, Brazil

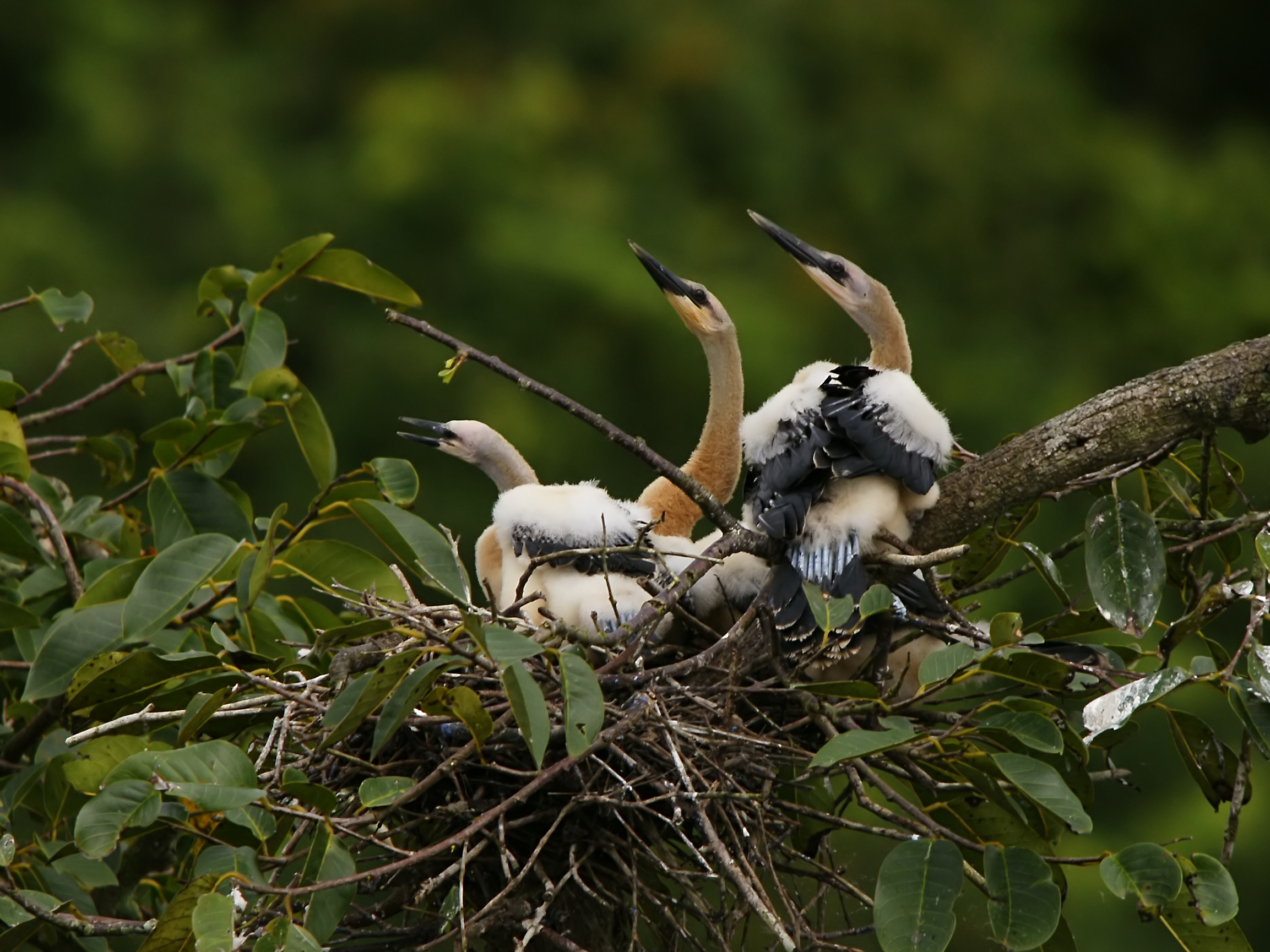
Juveniles with white plumage in Caño Negro, Costa Rica

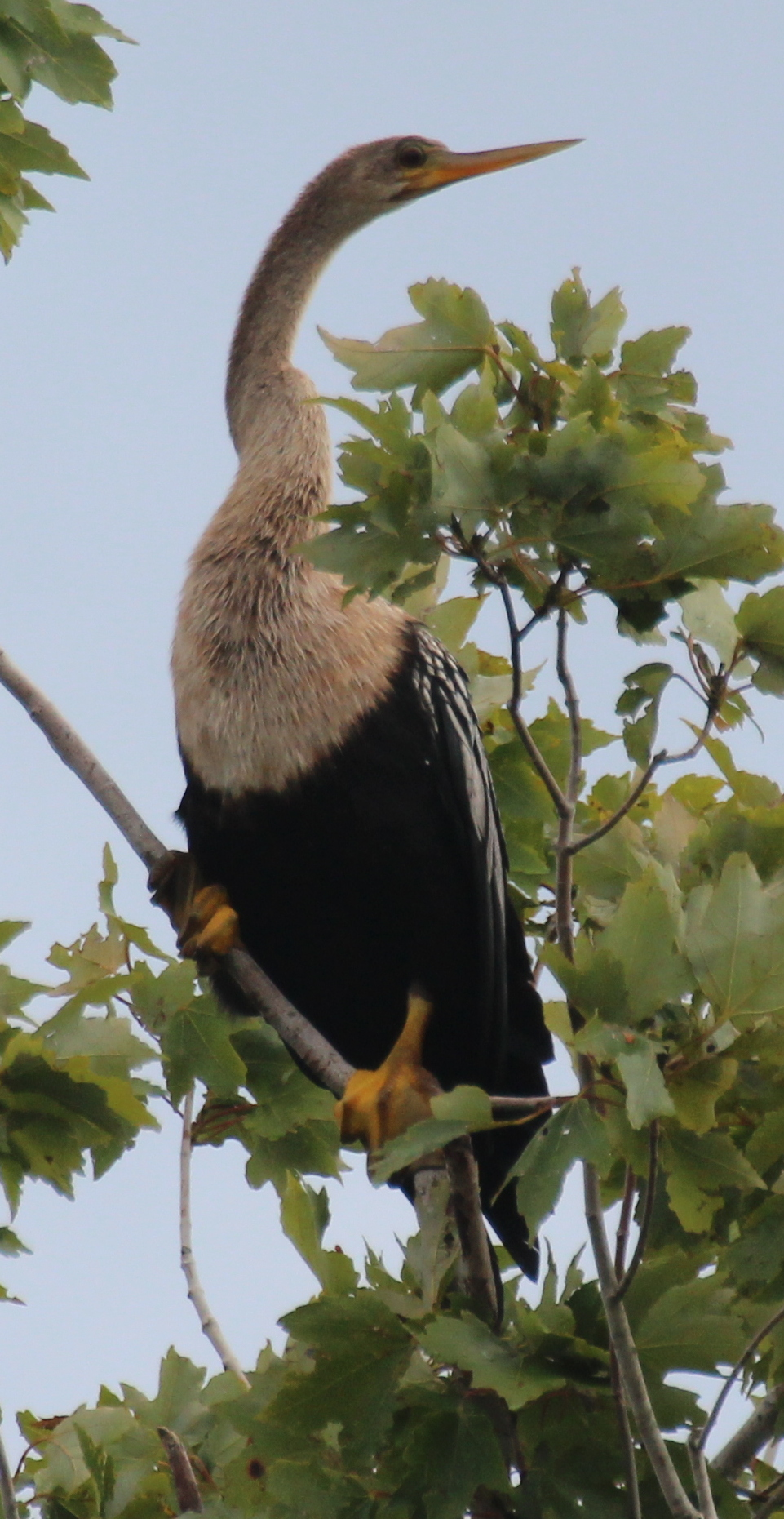
Female in Florida, US

Female in Everglades National Park, Florida, US
