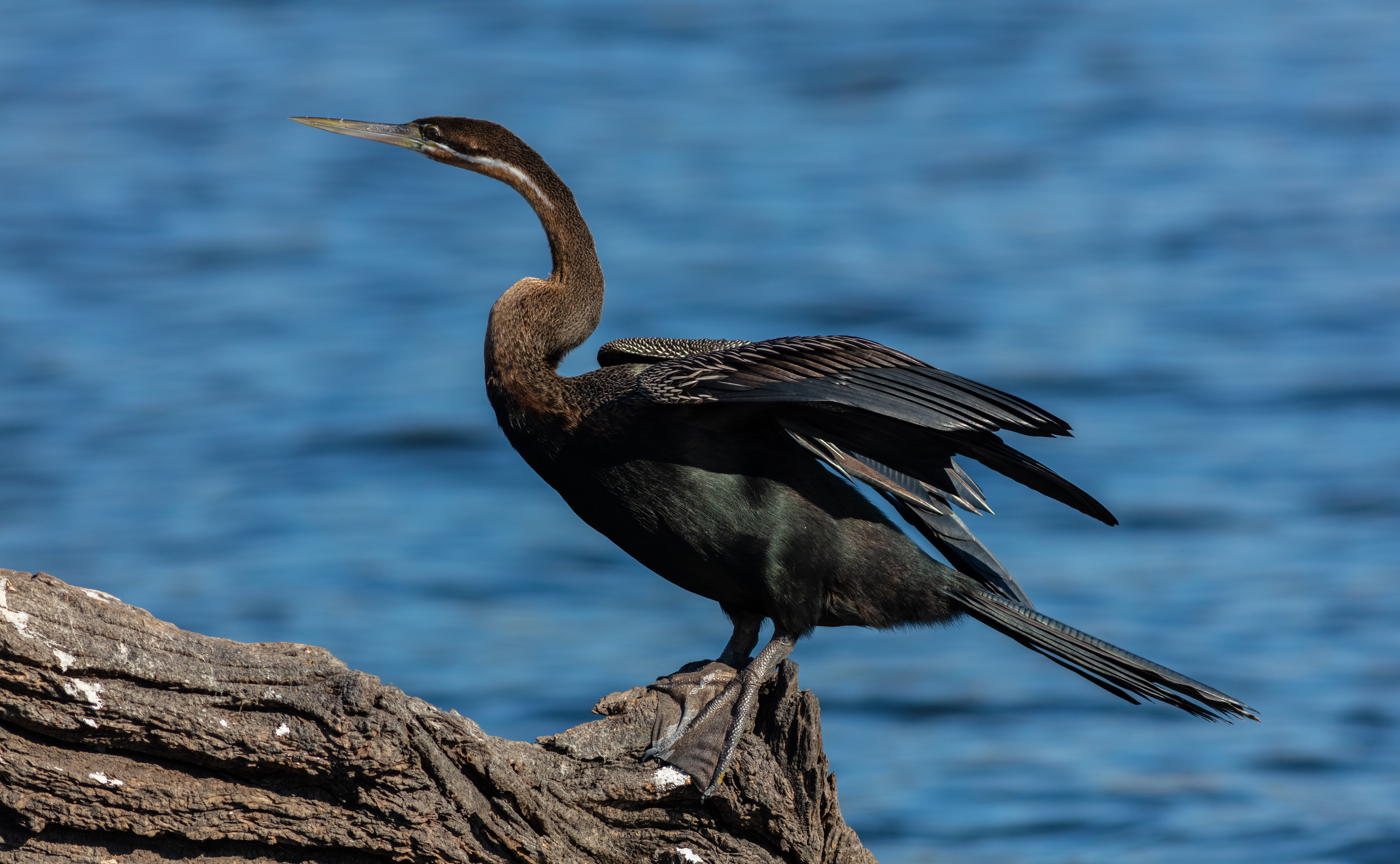
- In Botswana

Conservation status
- Least Concern (IUCN 3.1)

Scientific classification
- Kingdom: Animalia
- Phylum: Chordata
- Class: Aves
- Order: Suliformes
- Family: Anhingidae
- Genus: Anhinga
- Species: A. rufa

Binomial name
- Anhinga rufa (Daudin, 1802)
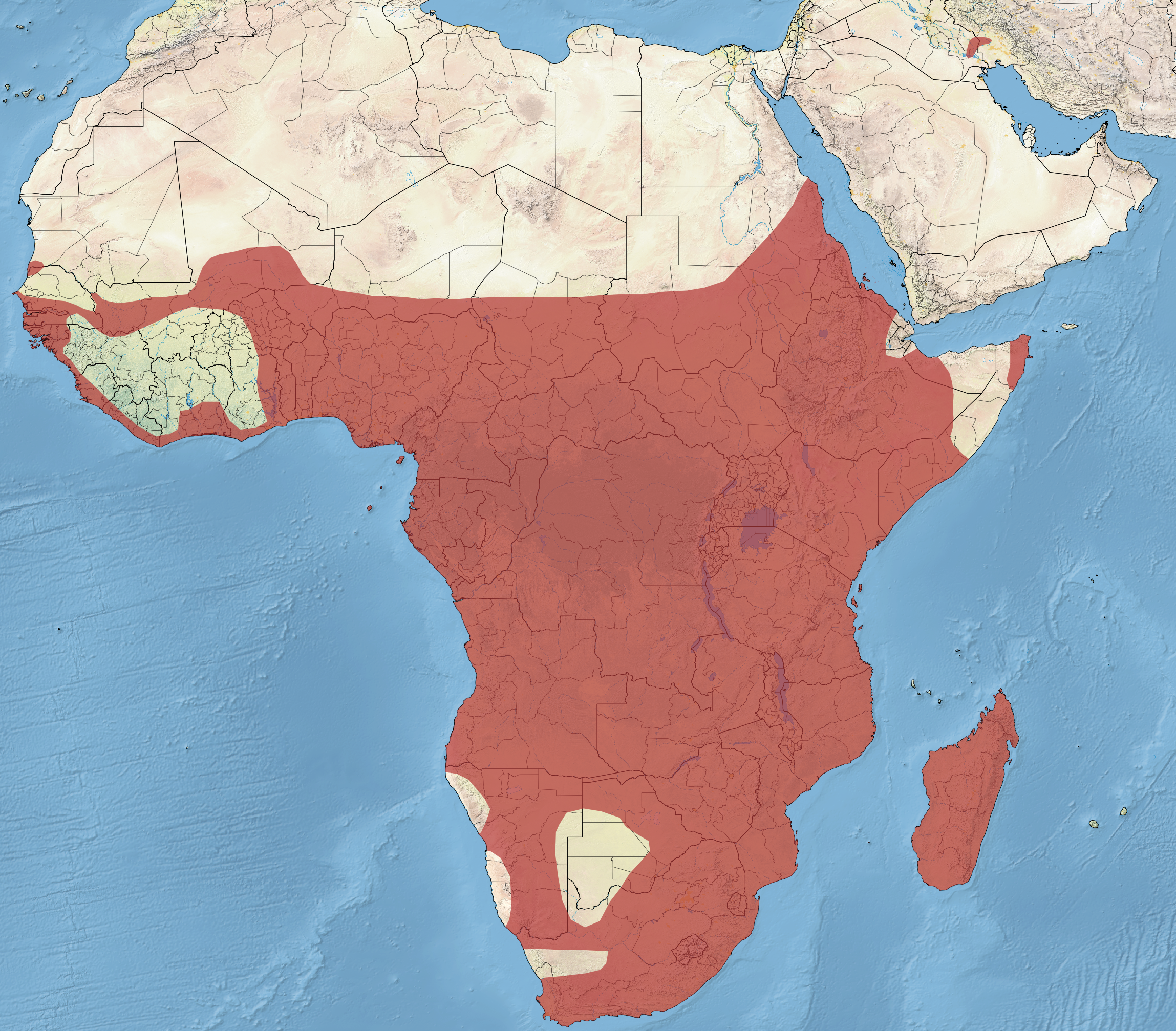
- resident range

Synonyms
- Anhinga africana

= African darter =

Species of bird

The African darter (Anhinga rufa), sometimes called the snakebird, is a water bird of Sub-Saharan Africa and Iraq.

== Taxonomy ==
The African darter is a member of the darter family, Anhingidae, and is closely related to American (A. anhinga), Oriental (A. melanogaster), and Australasian (A. novaehollandiae) darters.

== Description ==
The African darter is 80 cm (31 in) long. Like other anhingas, it has a very long neck. The male is mainly glossy black with white streaking; females and immature birds are browner. The African darter differs in appearance from the American darter most recognisably by its thin white lateral neck stripe against a rufous background colour. The pointed bill prevents confusion with cormorants.

== Distribution ==
The African darter is found throughout Sub-Saharan Africa wherever large bodies of water occur; overall, the species remains widespread and common.

The only non-African subspecies, the Levant darter (Anhinga rufa chantrei), occurred at Lake Amik (Amik Gölü) in south-central Turkey, in the Hula Valley lake and marshes in northern Israel and in the Mesopotamian Marshes of the lower Euphrates and Tigris rivers in southern Iraq. The Turkish population disappeared during the 1930s and the Israeli population during the drainage of the Hula in the 1950s. In Khuzestan, 110 birds were counted in 1990, but the subspecies was feared extinct as a result of oil spills during the Gulf War and the drainage of the Mesopotamian Marshes that followed it. However, a small population was documented in the Hawizeh Marshes in 2007. The drainage of the marshes was interrupted and reversed after the Iraq War.

== Behavior ==
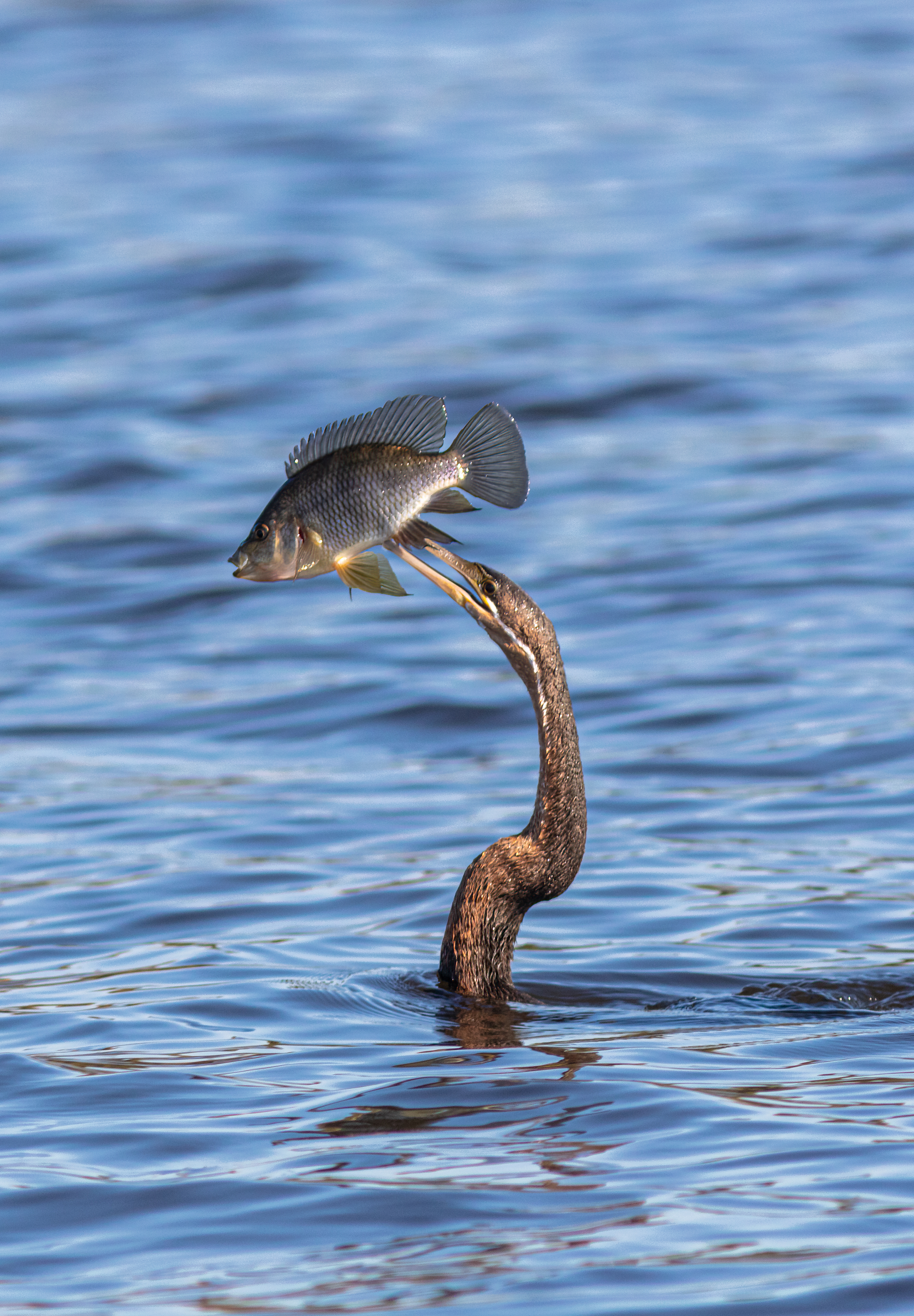
With cichlid prey, in Botswana

This species builds a stick nest in a tree and lays 3–6 eggs. It often nests with herons, egrets and cormorants.

It often swims with only the neck above water, hence the common name snakebird. This, too, is a habit shared with the other anhingas. It feeds on fish, which it catches by diving.

Unlike many other waterbirds the feathers of the African darter do not contain any oil and are therefore not waterproof. Because of this, the bird is less positively buoyant and its diving capabilities are enhanced. After diving for fish, the feathers can become waterlogged. In order to be able to fly and maintain heat insulation, it needs to dry its feathers. Thus the African darter is often seen sitting along the waterside spreading its wings and drying its feathers in the wind and the sun along with cormorants, which may share its habitat.

== Gallery ==
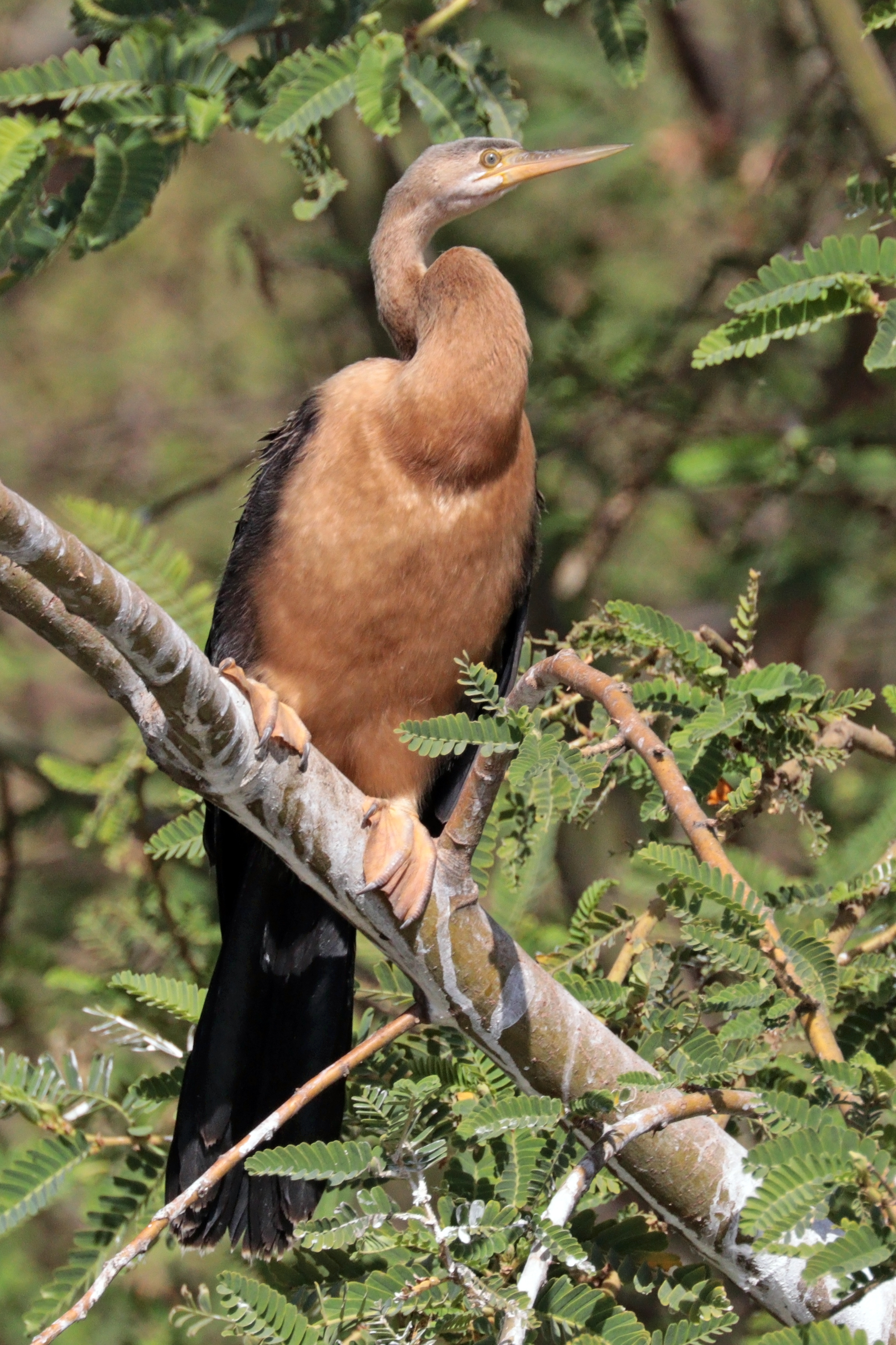
female
Ethiopia

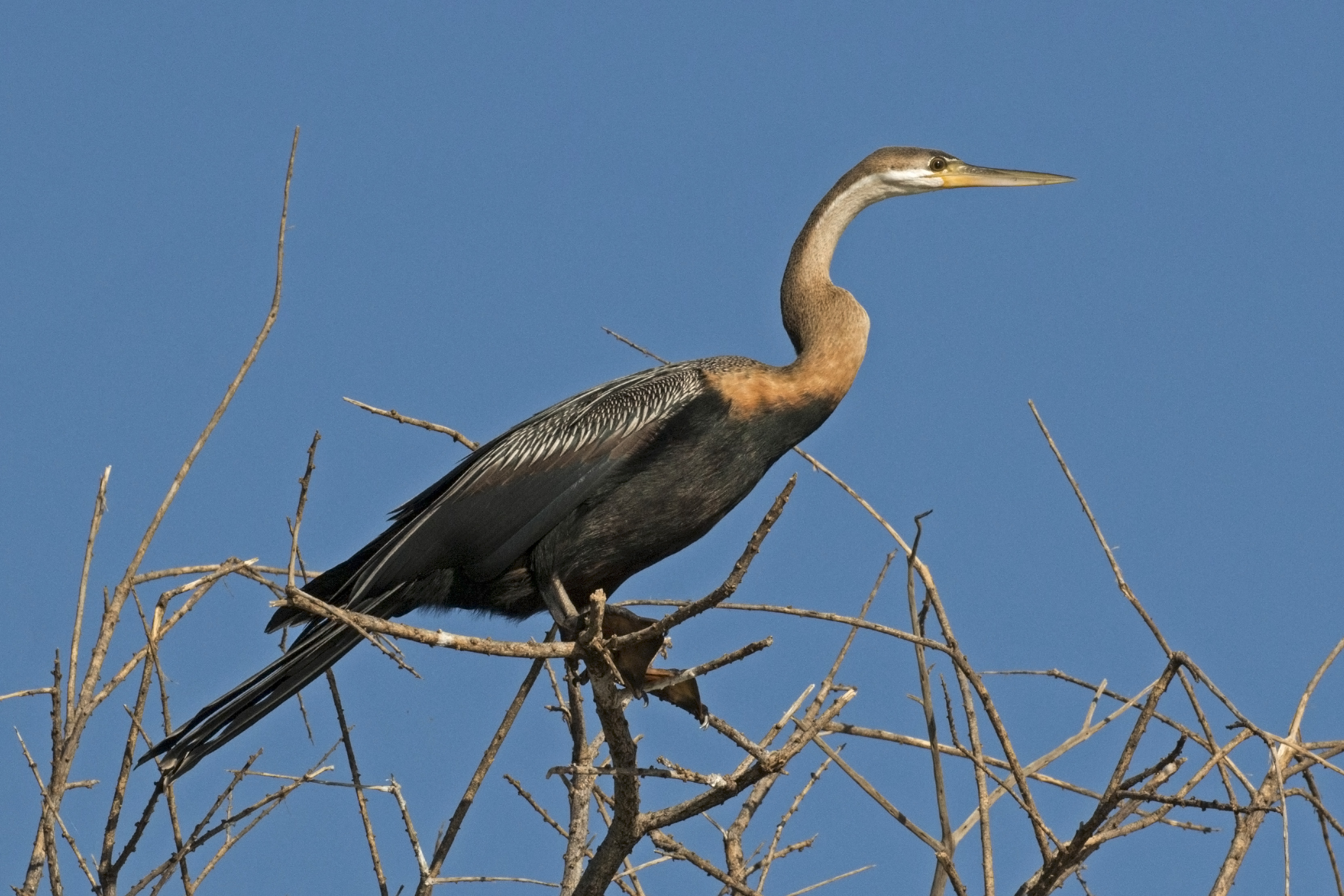
immature
Lake Baringo, Kenya

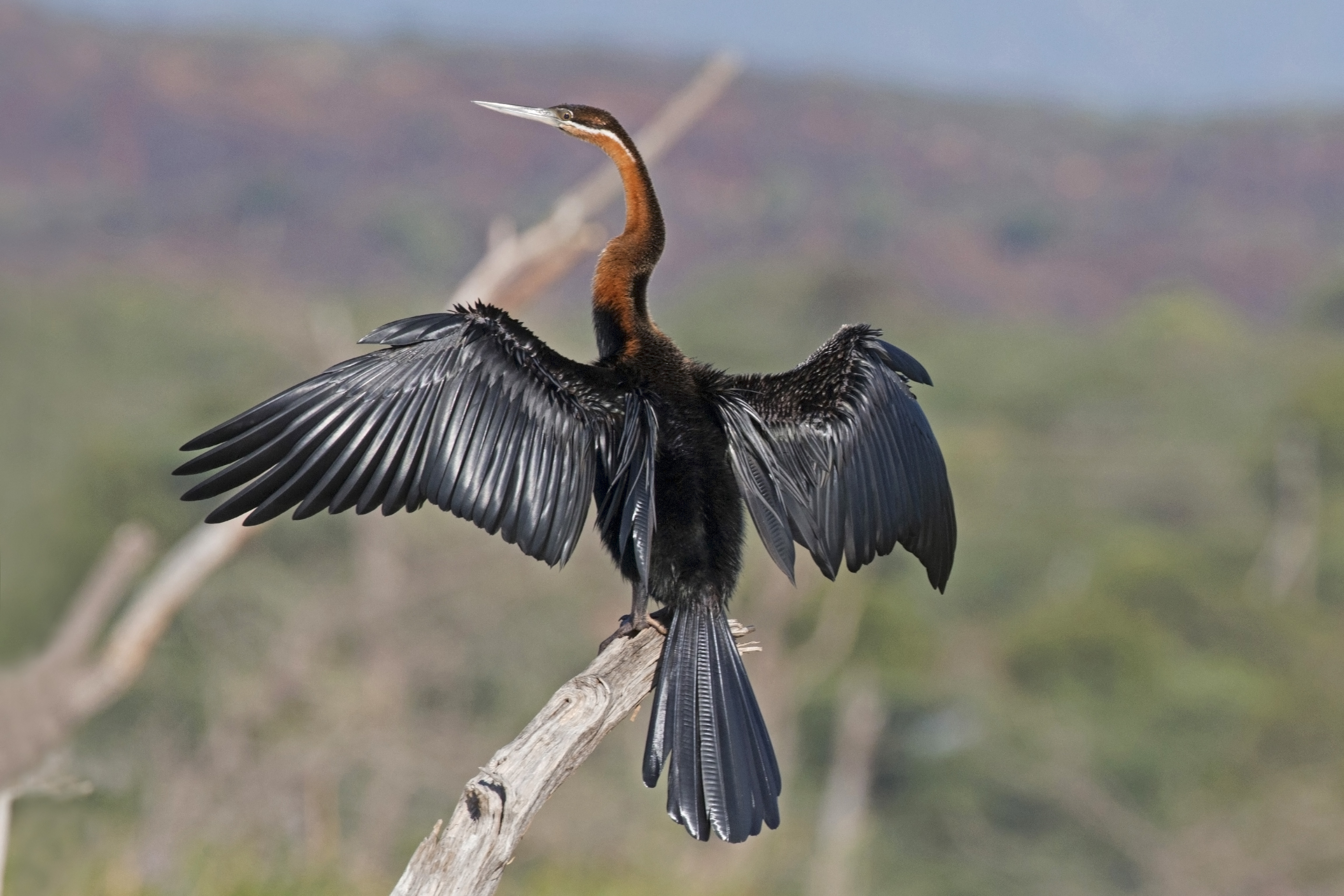
adult male drying wings
Lake Baringo, Kenya

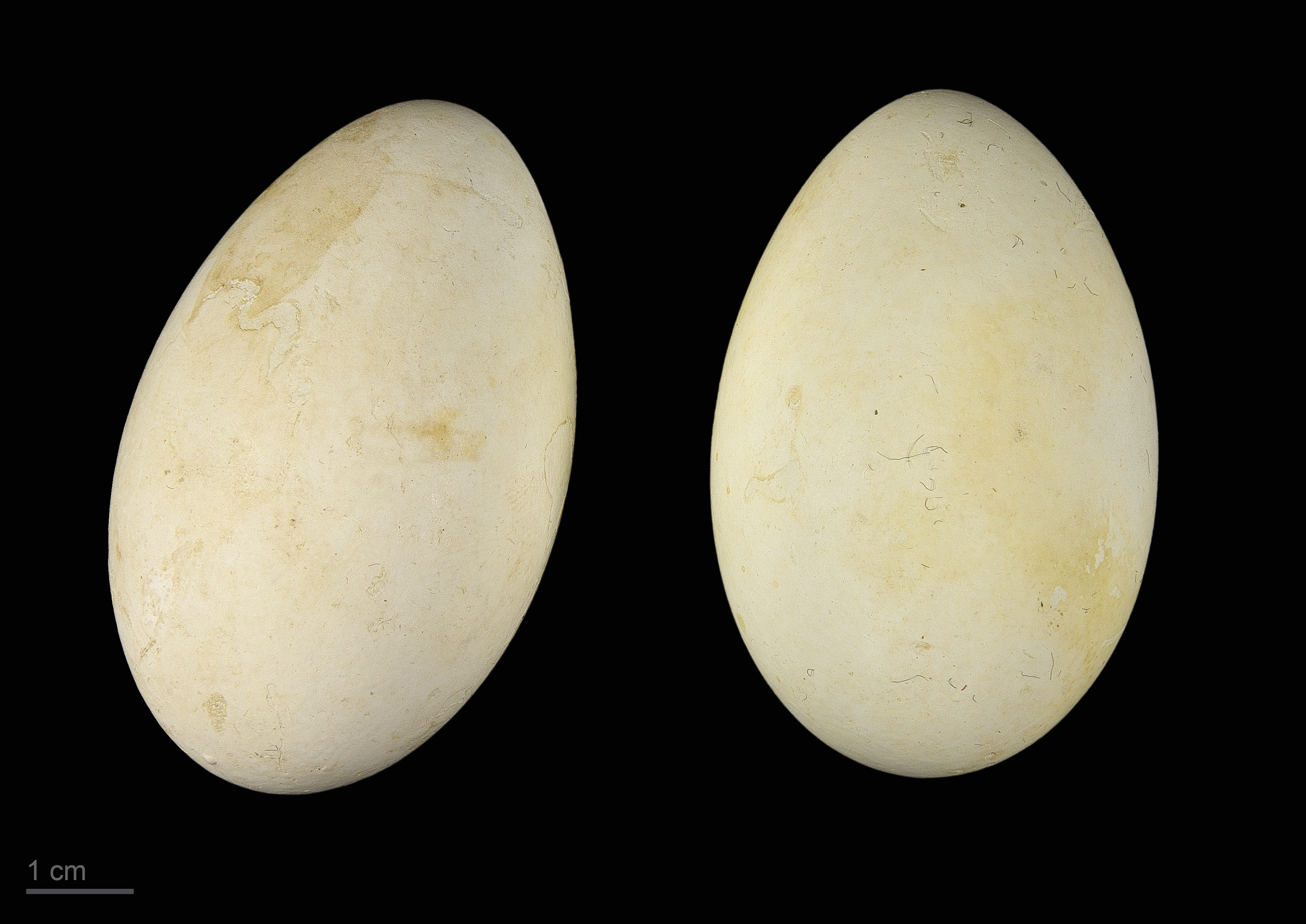
Anhinga rufa chantrei - MHNT

== Bibliography ==
- Birds of The Gambia by Barlow, Wacher and Disley, ISBN 1-873403-32-1
- Birds of Southern Africa by Sinclair, Hockey, Tarboton, ISBN 978-1-86872-721-6
