= Macranhinga =

Macranhinga Temporal range: Late Miocene (Huayquerian) ~9–7.3 Ma

Scientific classification
- Domain: Eukaryota
- Kingdom: Animalia
- Phylum: Chordata
- Class: Aves
- Order: Suliformes
- Family: Anhingidae
- Genus: †Macranhinga; Noriega, 1992

Type species
- Macaranhinga paranensis Noriega 1992

Species
- M. paranensis Noriega 1992; M. ranzii Alvarenga & Guilherme 2003

Extinct genus of birds

Macranhinga is a genus of extinct darters belonging to the Anhingidae. The type species is M. paranensis, which was described on the basis of complete tarsometatarsi and several dissociated skeletal elements. All the specimens come from the Ituzaingó Formation that crops out discontinuously along the eastern cliffs of the Paraná River in northeastern Argentina, the river from which the specific epithet is derived. The most striking feature of this bird is its large size, much greater than in all other known fossil or extant anhingas.

A second species, M. ranzii was described from the Solimões Formation in Acre, Amazonian Brazil, and this species was later found in the Ituzaingó Formation.
