= Anhinga walterbolesi =

Anhinga walterbolesi Temporal range: Late Oligocene–Early Miocene

Scientific classification
- Kingdom: Animalia
- Phylum: Chordata
- Class: Aves
- Order: Suliformes
- Family: Anhingidae
- Genus: Anhinga
- Species: †A. walterbolesi

Binomial name
- †Anhinga walterbolesi Worthy, 2012

Extinct species of bird

Anhinga walterbolesi is an extinct species of darter from the Late Oligocene to Early Miocene of Australia. It was described from fossil material (a left tarsometatarsus) collected in 1982 from the Etadunna Formation of the Snake Dam site, in the Lake Eyre Basin of north-eastern South Australia. The specific epithet honours Australian palaeontologist Walter Boles for his contributions to Australian palaeornithology.
