= Meganhinga =

Meganhinga Temporal range: Miocene

Scientific classification
- Kingdom: Animalia
- Phylum: Chordata
- Class: Aves
- Order: Suliformes
- Family: Anhingidae
- Genus: †Meganhinga
- Species: †M. chilensis

Binomial name
- †Meganhinga chilensis Alvarenga, 1995

Extinct genus of bird

Meganhinga is an extinct genus of anhingid that lived during the Miocene epoch.

== Distribution ==
Meganhinga chilensis is known from the Cura-Mallín Formation of Chile.
