= Bole =

Bole may refer to:

== Places ==
- Bole District, Ghana
- Bole, Ghana, town
- Bole (Ghana parliament constituency)
- Bole, Nottinghamshire, England
- Bole (Sub-City of Addis Ababa), Ethiopia
  - Addis Ababa Bole International Airport, Ethiopia
- Bole, Xinjiang, China
  - Bole Alashankou Airport
- Pasila, area of Helsinki in Finland called Böle in Swedish, one of the municipality's official languages
- Böle (Piteå Municipality), a locality situated in Norrbotten County, Sweden

== Other uses ==
- An alternate name for the trunk of a tree; used in modern forestry and in archaic contexts.
- Bole (color), a reddish-brown color
  - Armenian bole a reddish clay material used in painting
  - Levant bole, similar, used in historical medicine.
- Bole language, an Afro-Asiatic language spoken in Nigeria
- Bole language (Bantu), a Bantu language in the Congo
- Bo Le, a Chinese horse physiognomer
- Bole2Harlem, an Ethiopian hip hop fusion band
- Bee bole, a cavity or alcove in a wall or other structure used for bee-keeping
- Mount Bole, a mountain in Montana, USA
- Bole (unit), an archaic unit for momentum
- A hearth where lead was smelted on a bole hill
- Abbreviation of "Board of Law Examiners".

== See also ==
- Bol (disambiguation)
- Boles (disambiguation)
- Boll (disambiguation)
- Bolle (disambiguation)
- Bollé (disambiguation)
- Boule (disambiguation)
- Bowl (disambiguation)
