= Terra rosa =

The term terra rosa (a misspelling of 'terra rossa', Italian for "red soil") can refer to:

- Terra rosa (soil), a red clay soil produced by the weathering of limestone
- Terra rosa (colour), a red colour
- Terra Rosa (band), a Japanese hard rock band
