= A. novaehollandiae =

A. novaehollandiae may refer to:

- Accipiter novaehollandiae, the grey goshawk, a bird species
- Anhinga novaehollandiae, the Australasian darter, a bird species
