= Boles =

Boles may refer to:

== People ==
- Boles (surname)

== Places in the United States ==
- Boles, Arkansas
- Boles, California
- Boles, Missouri
- Boles Acres, New Mexico

== See also ==
- Bole (disambiguation)
- Bowls
