= Karaivetti Bird Sanctuary =

- IUCN category IV (habitat/species management area)
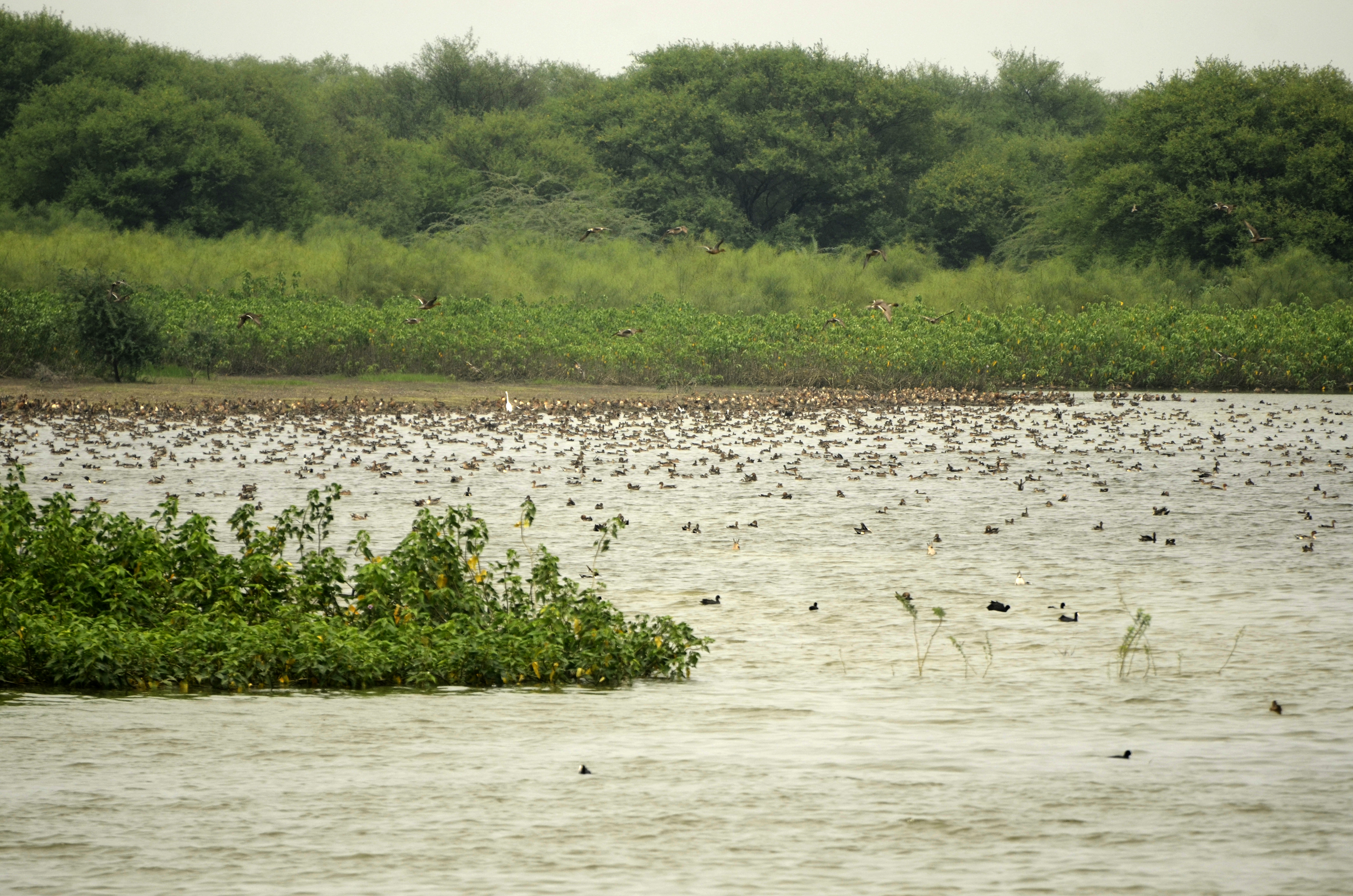
- View of Karaivetti Bird Sanctuary

- Location within Tamil Nadu Location within India
- Interactive map of Karaivetti Bird Sanctuary
- Location: Ariyalur, Tamil Nadu, India
- Nearest city: Thanjavur
- Coordinates: 10°58′13″N 79°02′29″E
- Area: 4.54 km^{2} (1.75 sq mi)
- Established: April, 1989
- Governing body: Ministry of Environment and Forests, Government of India

The Karaivetti Bird Sanctuary is a 4.537-square-kilometre (1.752 sq mi) protected area and Ramsar site, located in the Ariyalur District of the state of Tamil Nadu, India. The sanctuary is about 25 kilometres (16 mi) from Thanjavur and about 21 kilometres (13 mi) from Ariyalur. This freshwater lake is fed by Pullambadi, Kattalal canal and attracts thousands of birds every year. This lake was declared as a sanctuary in 1999 by the Government of Tamil Nadu and in 2024, it became a Ramsar site. About 200 birds are species recorded from this sanctuary. Karaivetti Bird Sanctuary is one of the Important Bird Areas (IBA's) of Tamil Nadu (Code No. IN268, Criteria: A1, A4i, A4iii).

Karaivetti Bird Sanctuary is home to migratory birds such as bar-headed goose, Northern pintail, white stork, Northern shoveler, Garganey, blue-winged teal, osprey and common sandpiper.

The sanctuary is a large irrigation tank located in the northern alluvial plains of the Kaveri river. It is fed during the northeast monsoons by the Pullambadi canal. It is also referred to together with another nearby tank and called Vettakudi-Karaivetti Bird Sanctuary. Farm lands especially paddy, sugarcane, cotton, castor and maize are surrounded by this lake and irrigated from this lake. Acacia nilotica planted inside the lake is serving as a major nesting site for birds.

During winter, the total number of birds recorded is between 20,000 and 60,000, mostly Anatidae. Globally threatened species such as Greater Spotted Eagle, Oriental Darter, Black-headed ibis and Spot-billed Pelican were reported in this site Karaivetti is one of the important active heronries in Tamil Nadu. Spot-billed Pelican, Black-headed ibis, Painted Stork, Oriental Darter, Eurasian Spoonbill are some of the birds species breeding in this sanctuary

Other fauna inhabit this region are Golden Jackal, Black-naped hare, Indian grey mongoose and nearly 15 species of fish were reported Karaivetti Bird Sanctuary attracts birdwatchers mainly during the winter season. Interpretation centre explaining the importance of the wetland and waterfowl of this sanctuary was established and opened for public in 2015.

The Karaivetti Bird Sanctuary had been declared as a Ramsar site - A Ramsar site is a wetland site designated to be of international importance under the Ramsar Convention,[1] also known as "The Convention on Wetlands", an international environmental treaty signed on 2 February 1971 in Ramsar, Iran, under the auspices of UNESCO. It came into force on 21 December 1975, when it was ratified by a sufficient number of nations. It provides for national action and international cooperation regarding the conservation of wetlands, and wise sustainable use of their resources.[1] Ramsar identifies wetlands of international importance, especially those providing waterfowl habitat.

== Gallery ==
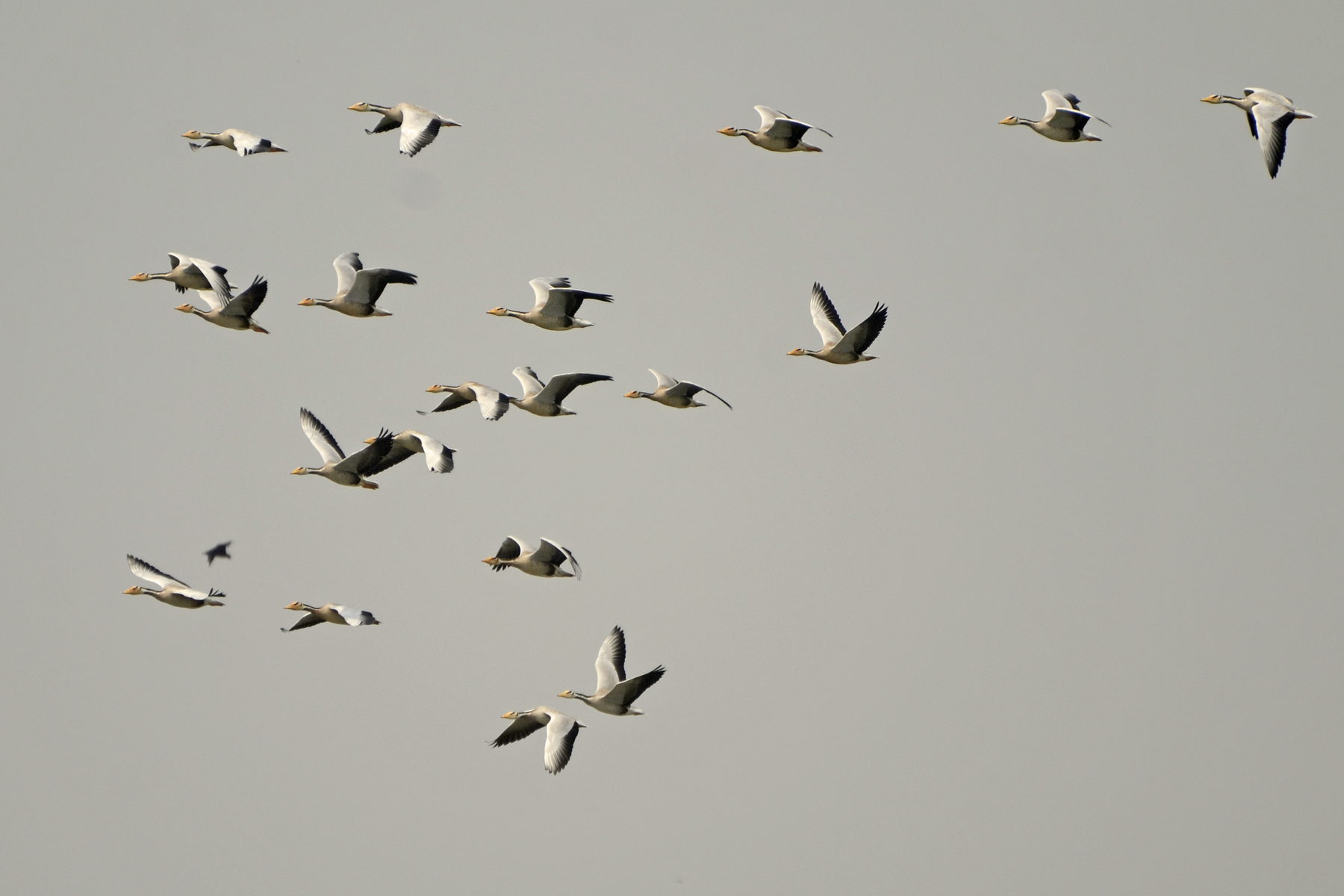
Bar headed geese (Anser indicus) in flight in Karaivetti Bird Sanctuary

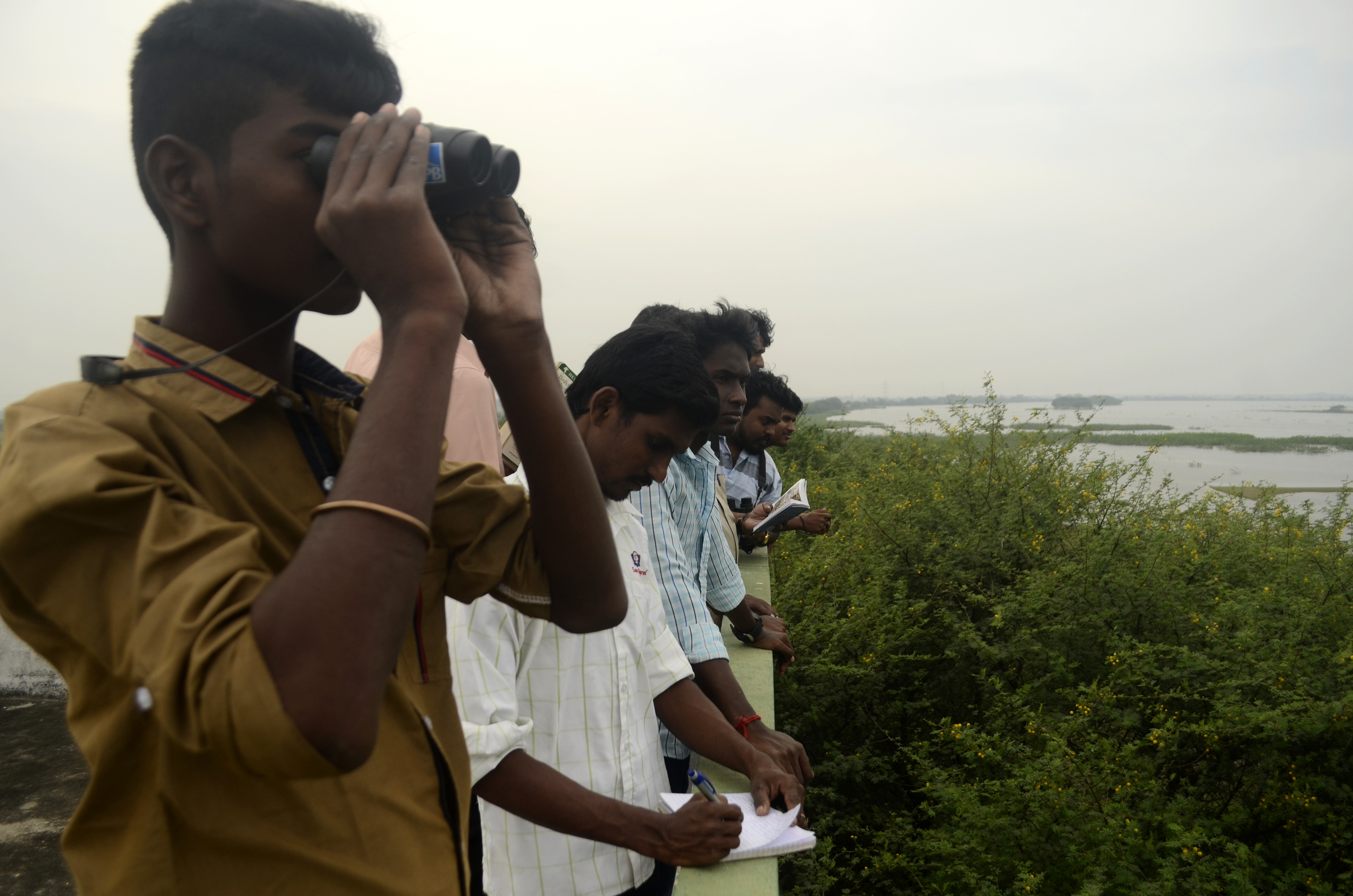
Birdwatchers in Karaivetti Bird Sanctuary

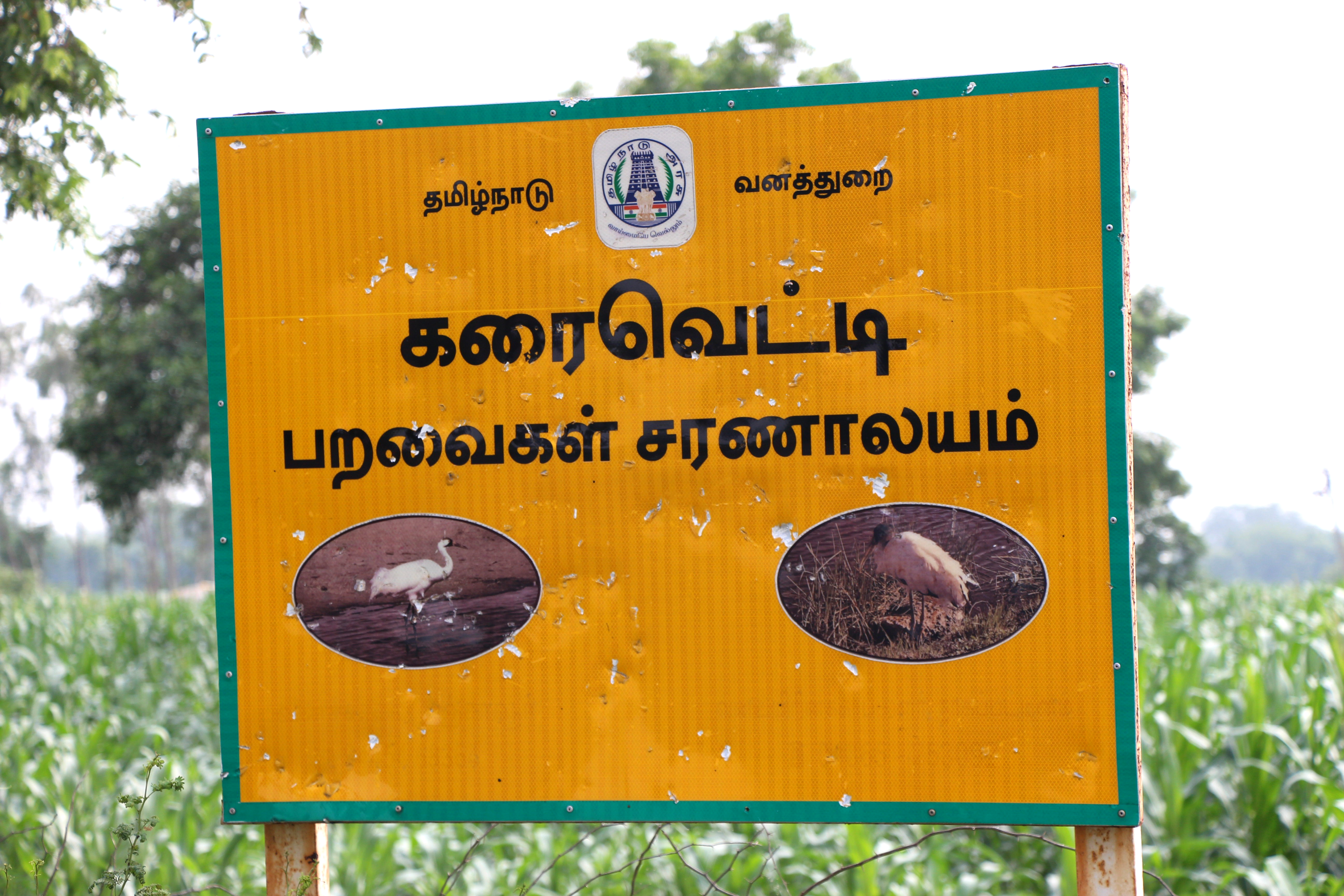
Board saying Karaivetti Bird Sanctuary

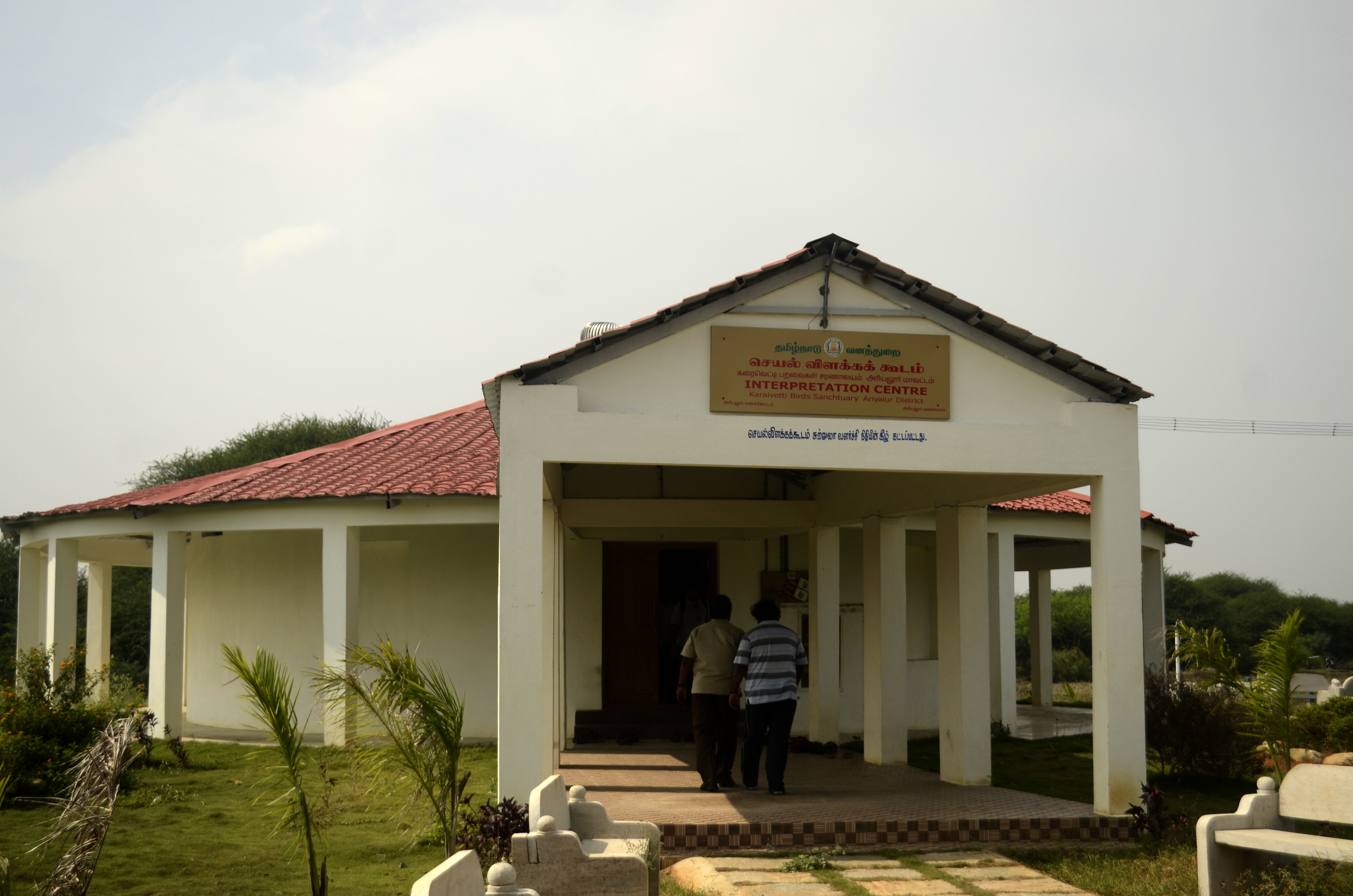
Interpretation Centre at Karaivetti Bird Sanctuary

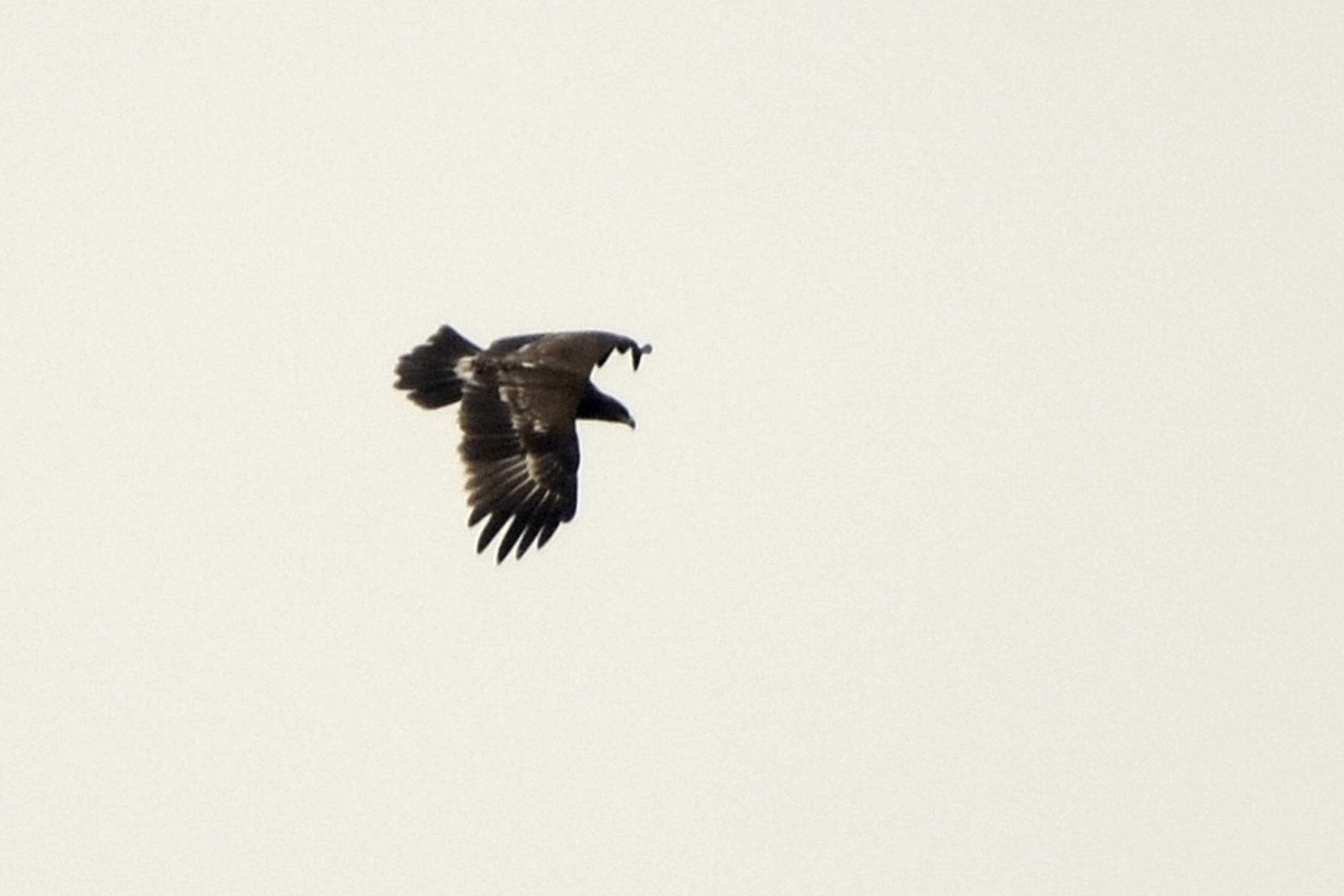
Greater Spotted Eagle (Clanga clanga) from Karaivetti Birds Sanctuary

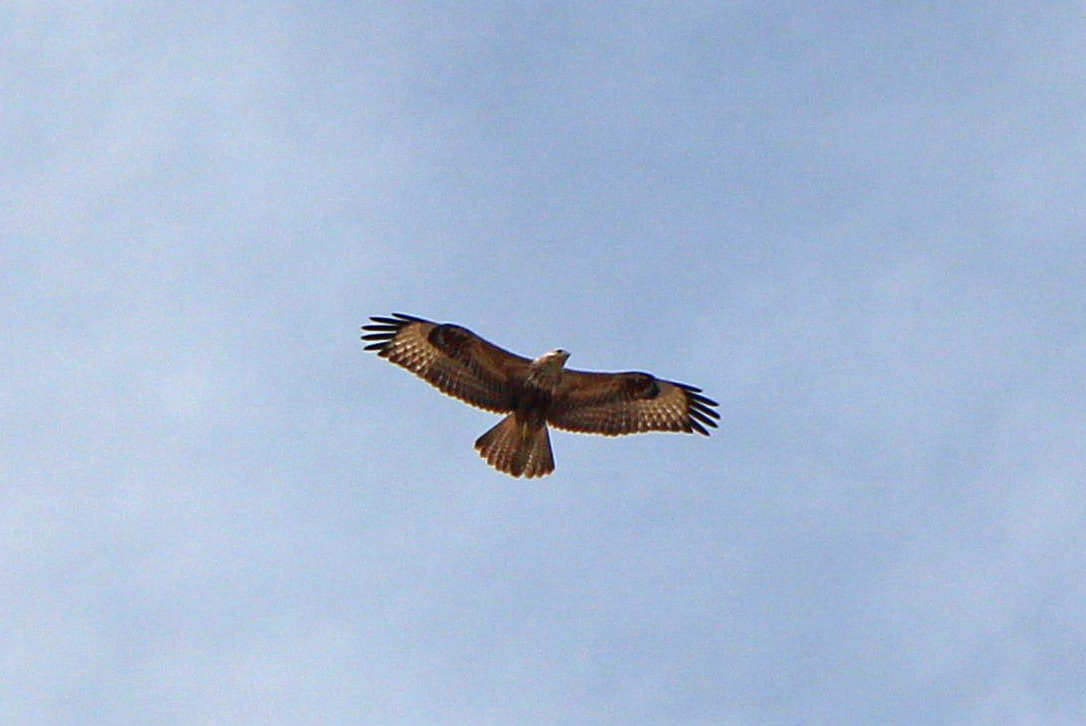
Common Buzzard (Buteo buteo vulpinus) in flight from Karaivetti Bird Sanctuary

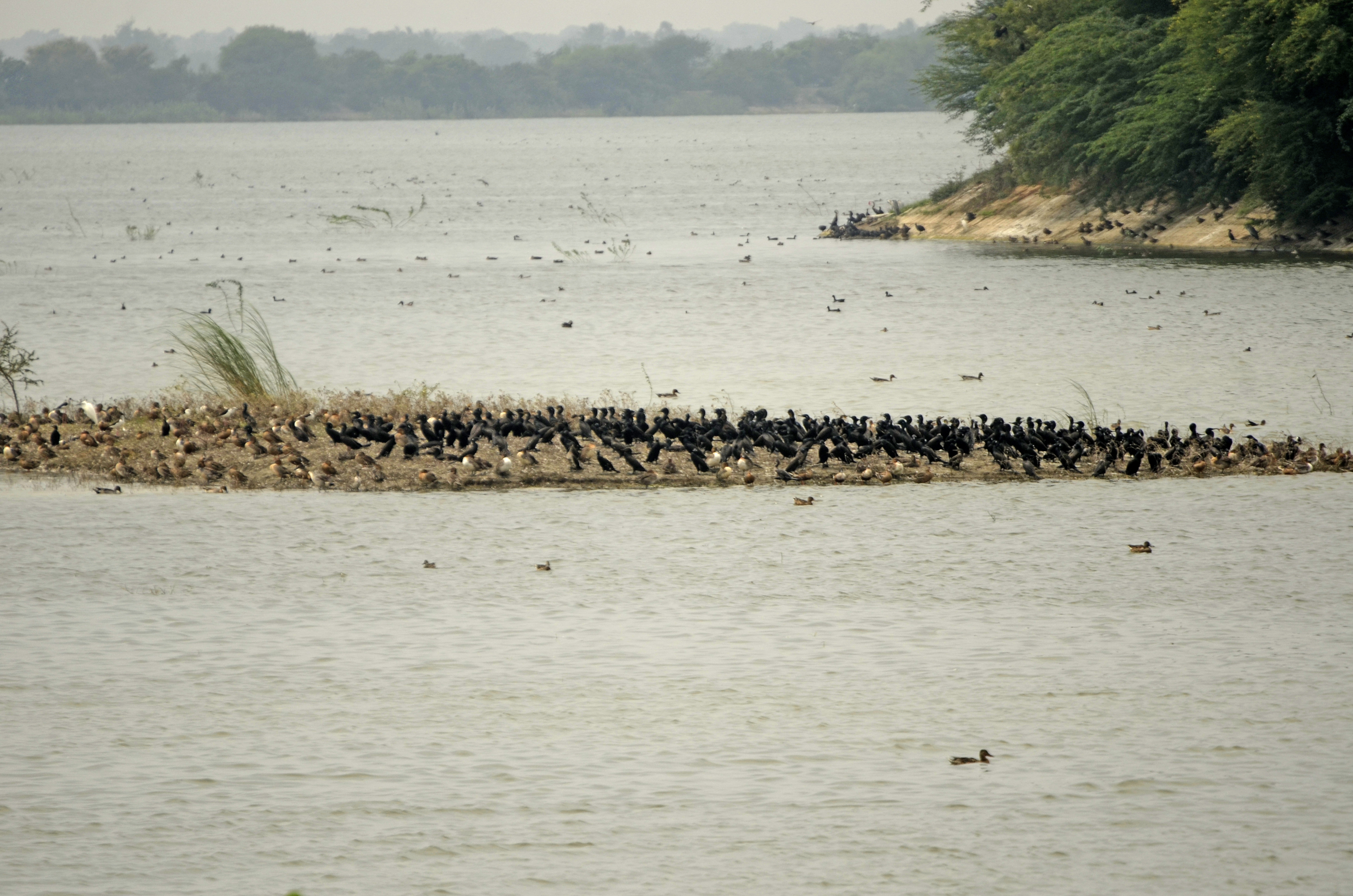
Cormorants and waterfowls in Karaivetti Bird Sanctuary
