= Boles (surname) =

Boles is a surname. Notable people with the surname include:

- Billy J. Boles (1938–2021), American Air Force general
- Boles baronets, British gentry family
- Brad Boles (born 1963), American politician
- Carl Boles (1934–2022), American baseball player
- Charles Earl Boles (c. 1829–after February 28, 1888), British-born American stagecoach robber, prospector, and soldier [see: Black Bart (outlaw)]
- Dennis Boles (British Army officer) (1885–1958), soldier and Conservative politician
- Denyc Boles (born ?), American politician
- Eckhard Boles (born 1963), German microbiologist, biotechnologist, and professor
- Ewing T. Boles (1895–1992), American investment banker and philanthropist
- H. Leo Boles (1874–1946), American preacher, writer, and academic administrator
- Henry Clifford Boles (1910–1979), American architect
- Jack Boles (1913–2013), British Colonial civil servant and administrator
- James L. Boles Jr. (born 1961), American politician
- Jason Boles (1851–1920), Australian politician
- Jim Boles (1914–1977), American actor
- Joe Boles (1880–1950), Australian footballer
- John Boles (disambiguation), several people
- Ken Boles (1933–2022), American politician
- Kevin Boles (born 1975), American baseball player and manager
- Lawrence C. Boles (1883–1943), American college football player and coach
- Nick Boles (born 1965), British politician
- Philana Marie Boles (born ?), American young adult author
- Stanley A. Boles (1887–1961), American basketball and golf coach, and university athletic director
- Thomas Boles (1837–1905), American politician and judge
- Tom Boles (born 1944), Scottish amateur astronomer, author, and broadcaster
- Tony Boles (born 1967), American football player
- Vincent E. Boles (fl. 1976–2009), American army general
