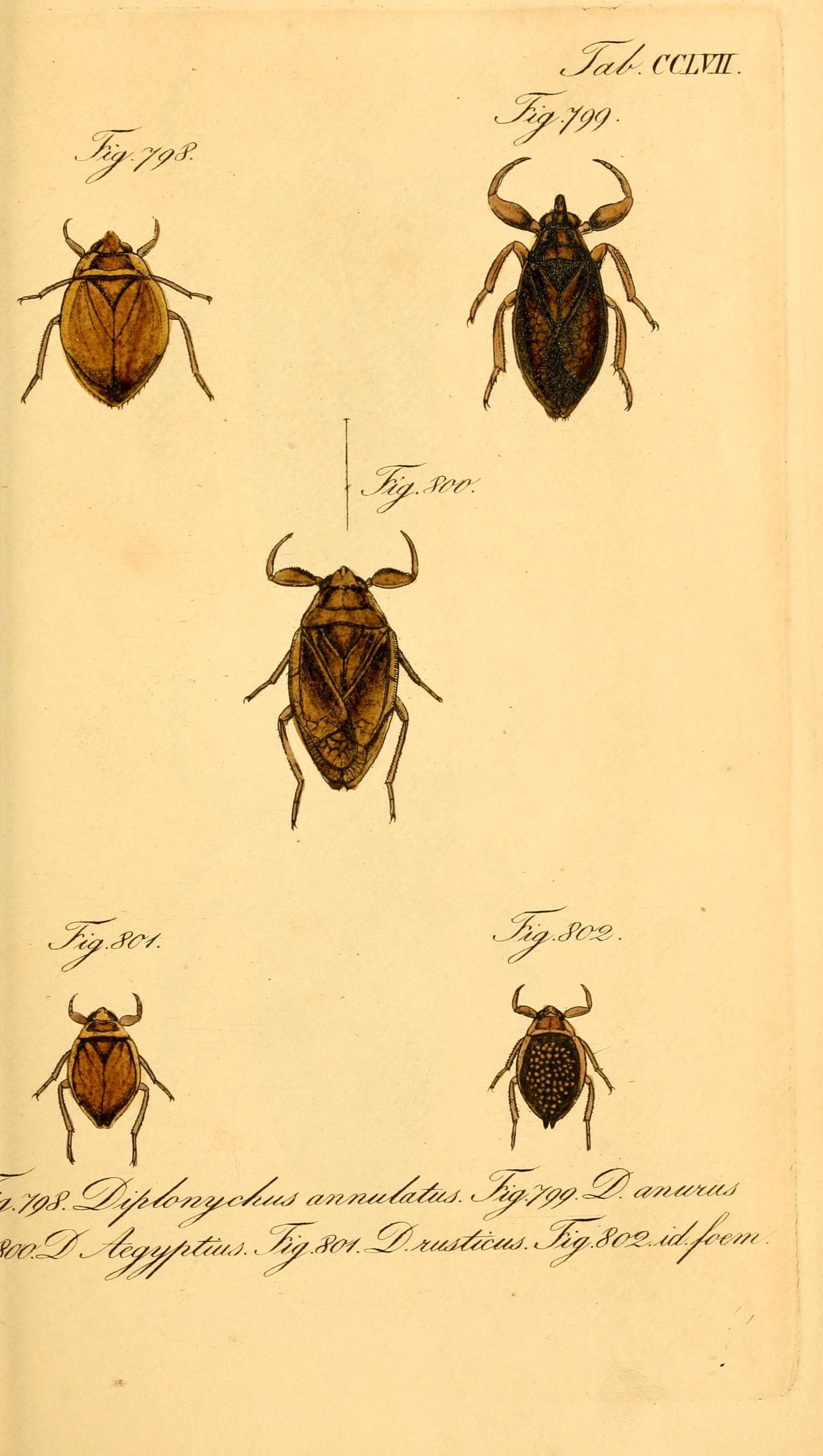

Scientific classification
- Kingdom: Animalia
- Phylum: Arthropoda
- Clade: Pancrustacea
- Class: Insecta
- Order: Hemiptera
- Suborder: Heteroptera
- Family: Belostomatidae
- Subfamily: Belostomatinae
- Genus: Diplonychus; Laporte, 1833

Synonyms
- Atomya Spinola, 1850; CyclodemaDufour, 1863; Sphaerodema Laporte, 1833

= Diplonychus =

Genus of insects

Diplonychus is a genus of true bugs belonging to the family Belostomatidae.

The species of this genus are found in Southern Africa, Southeastern Asia and Australia.

Species:

- Diplonychus annulatus (Fabricius, 1781)
- Diplonychus eques (Dufour, 1863)
- Diplonychus esakii Miyamoto & Lee, 1966
- Diplonychus heeri Polhemus, 1995
- Diplonychus rusticus (Fabricius, 1871)
- Diplonychus stali (Mayr, 1871)
- Sphaerodema microcephalum Zhang et al., 1994
