= Levant bole =

Earthy clay brought from the Levant, and historically used in medicine

Levant bole is an earthy clay brought from the Levant, and historically used in medicine for the same purposes as Armenian bole. It was indeed so similar to Armenian bole that some believed them both to be the same, or at least mixtures of each other. Levant bole was used in several compositions, particularly diascordium, to give it color.

Chambers discusses two other similar boles:

- Lemnian bole or terra lemia from the island of Lemnos, also called terra sigillata
- Samnian bole or terra samia from the island of Samos

== See also ==
- Armenian bole
