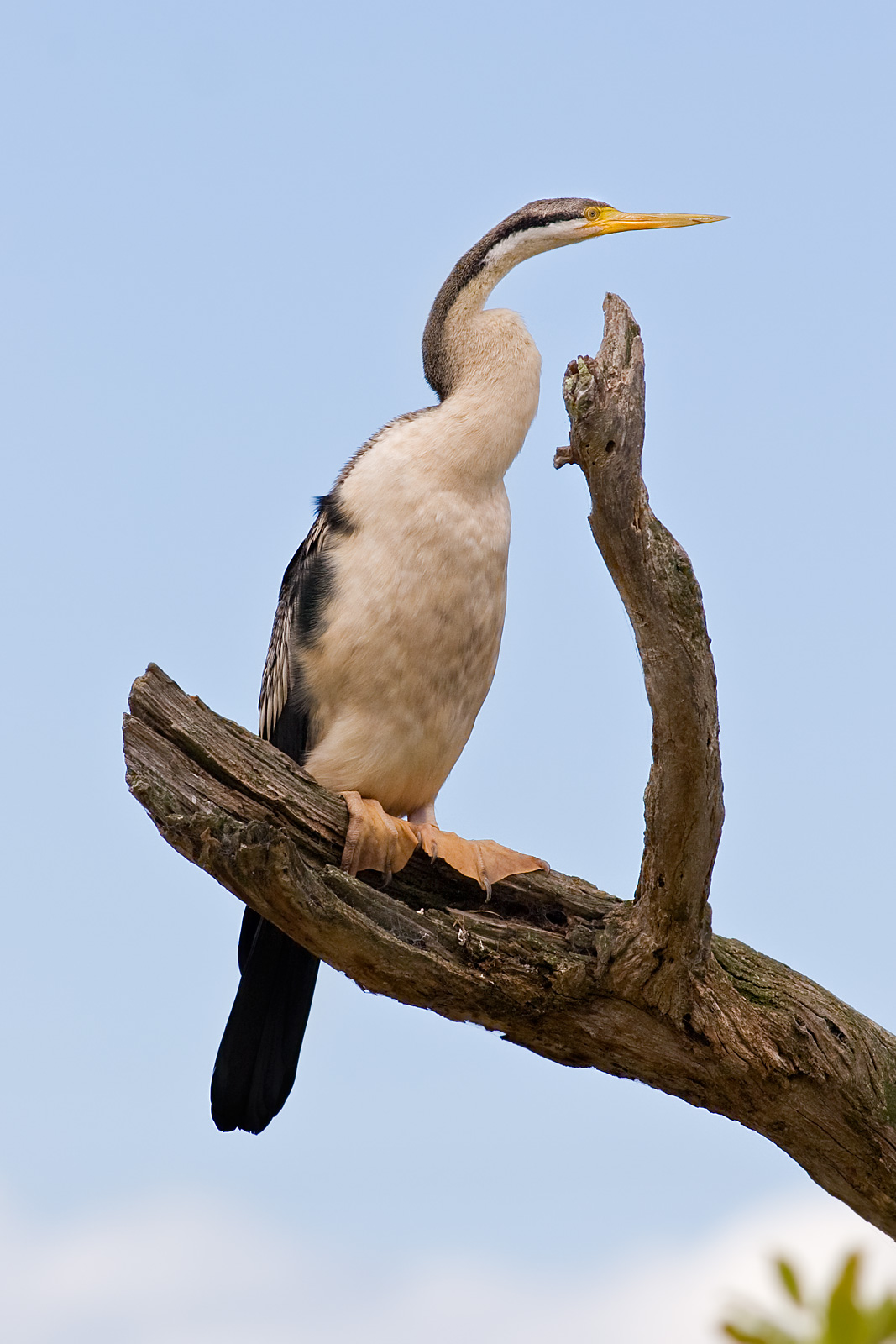
- Female
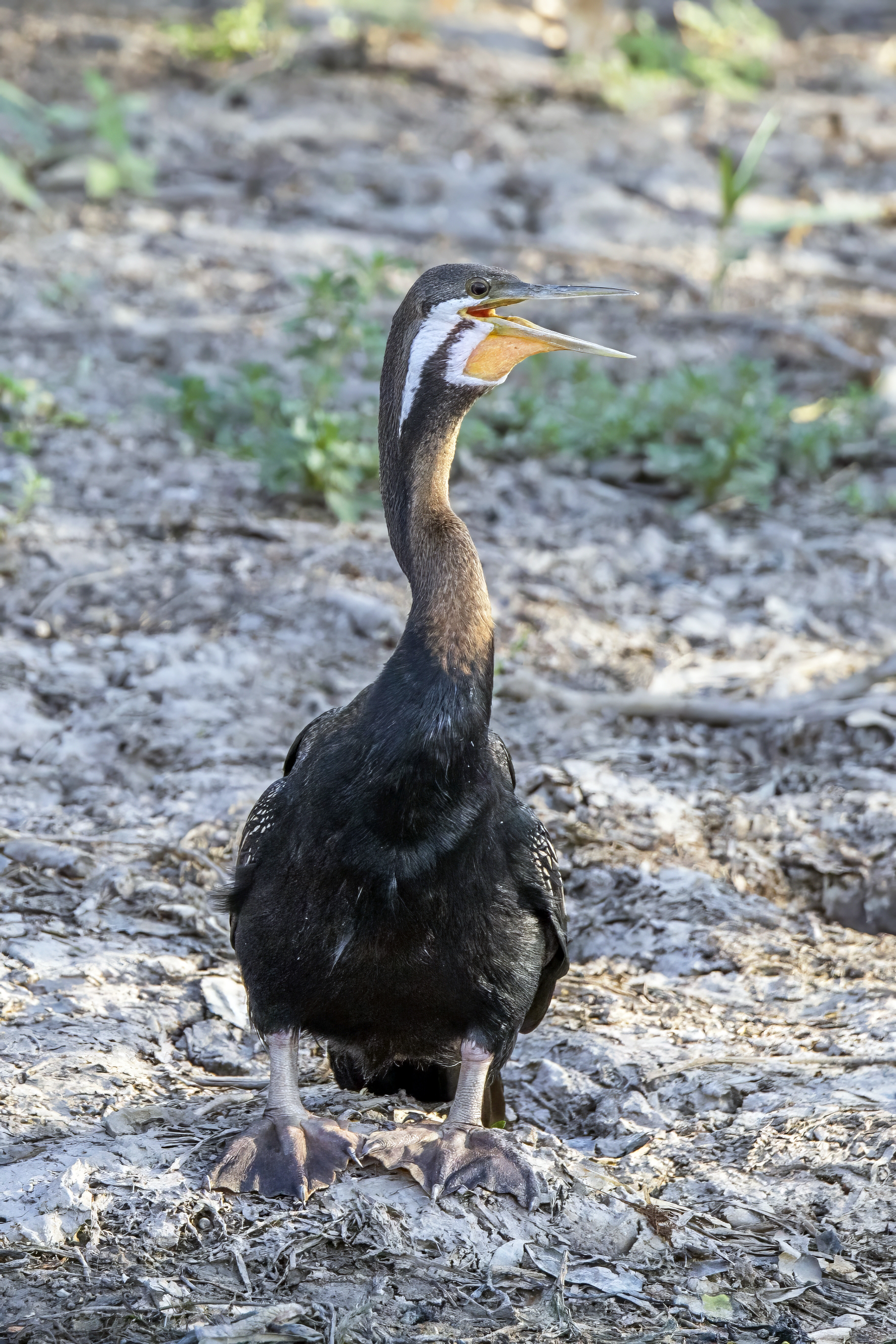
- Male

Conservation status
- Least Concern (IUCN 3.1)

Scientific classification
- Kingdom: Animalia
- Phylum: Chordata
- Class: Aves
- Order: Suliformes
- Family: Anhingidae
- Genus: Anhinga
- Species: A. novaehollandiae

Binomial name
- Anhinga novaehollandiae (Gould, 1847)
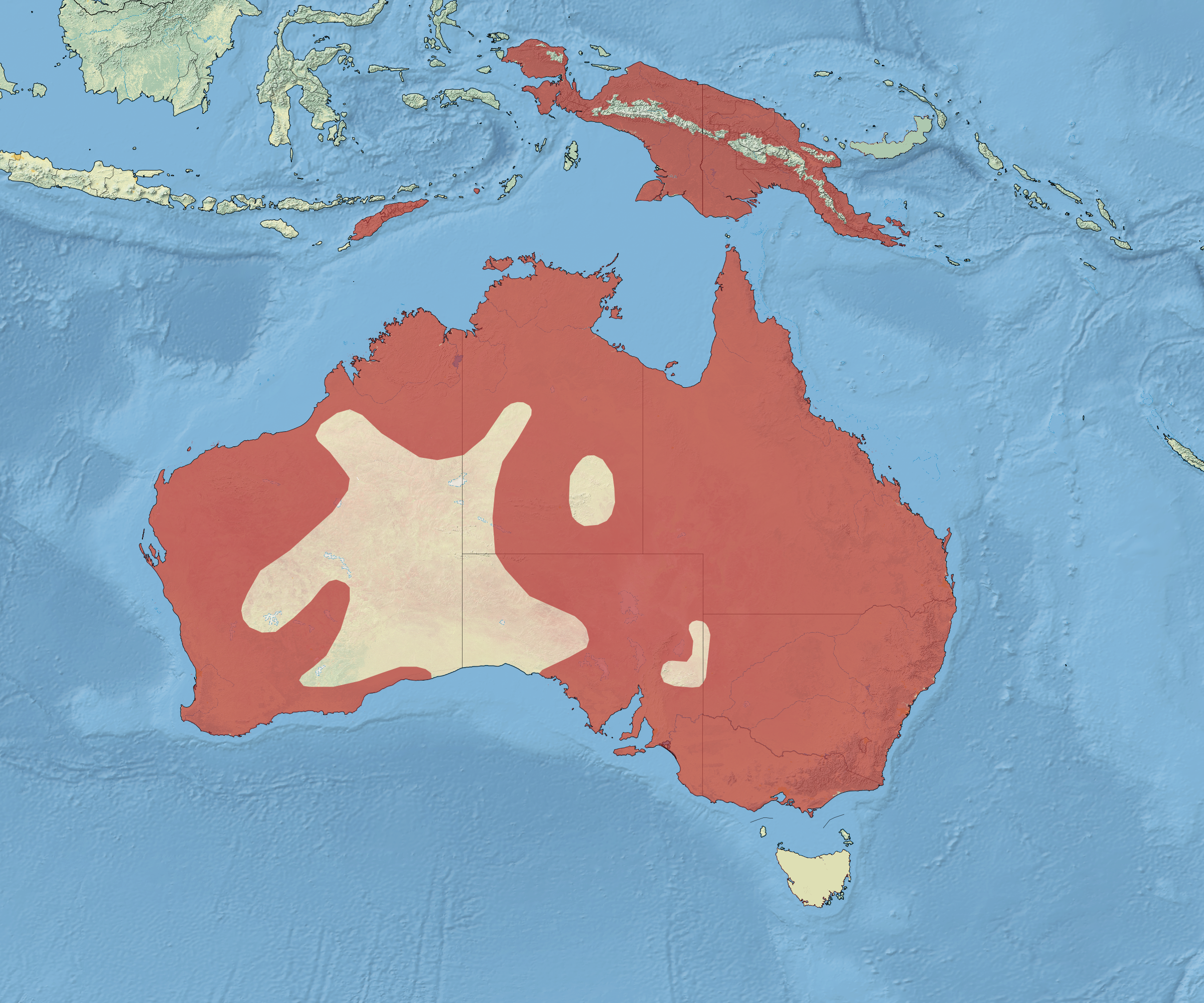
- Distribution map

Synonyms
- Anhinga laticeps (De Vis, 1906); Anhinga melanogaster novaehollandiae Plotus laticeps De Vis, 1906

= Australasian darter =

Species of bird

The Australasian darter or Australian darter (Anhinga novaehollandiae) is a species of bird in the darter family, Anhingidae. It is found in Australia, Indonesia, and Papua New Guinea. It weighs around 2.6 kg and spans 86–94 cm (34–37 in) in length.

== Taxonomy ==
John Gould described the Australasian darter as Plotus novaehollandiae in 1847. Closely related to American (Anhinga anhinga), African (Anhinga rufa), and Oriental (Anhinga melanogaster) darters, the Australasian darter has been classed as a subspecies of the African or African plus Oriental darters. All four have also been classed as a single species. Examination of the leg bones indicates the three Old World species are more closely related to each other with the American species more divergent. Genetic analysis showed it differed from A. rufa to a degree equivalent to that between other separate species, and shifted consensus to treating the Australasian darter as a separate species.

Fossils of the Australasian darter have been recovered from several Pleistocene strata in Australia.

As well as Australasian darter, common names given to the species include darter, diver, needle-beak shag, shag, and snake-bird. The Noongar people of southwestern Australia call it mimal. Gould also called it the New Holland darter or New Holland devil-bird.

== Description ==
The Australasian darter is a slim bird measuring 86–94 cm (34–37 in) long with a snakelike slender neck. The male has black plumage with a white streak down the side of its head and neck, while the female has white underparts.

== Distribution and habitat ==
Typical habitat is freshwater or brackish wetlands more than 0.5 m deep with fallen trees or logs and vegetated banks; less commonly, darters are found in inland saltwater environments. The Australasian darter is found in the lowlands of New Guinea, New Britain, the Moluccas and the Lesser Sunda Islands. It is found across Australia, though not in the Great Sandy or Great Victoria Deserts or Nullarbor Plain. It is an uncommon vagrant to Tasmania.

== Feeding ==
The Australasian darter forages in water, often with only its head and neck exposed. Its feathers soak up water in spaces between them, allowing the bird to reduce its natural buoyancy and swim underwater. It eats a wide variety of fish such as Australian smelt (Retropinna semoni), bony bream (Nematalosa erebi), queensland mouth breeder (Glossamia aprion), surf bream (Acanthopagrus australis), spangled perch (Leiopotherapon unicolor), flathead gudgeon (Philypnodon grandiceps), and introduced species such as redfin perch (Perca fluviatilis), goldfish (Carassius auratus) and carp (Cyprinus carpio). The New Guinea snake-necked turtle (Chelodina novaeguineae) is a prey item, as are many invertebrates including freshwater shrimp, worms and cephalopods, and insects such as flies, moths, water scavenger beetles (hydrophilidae), water beetles (dytiscidae), water boatmen (corixidae), giant water bugs (Diplonychus rusticus), and backswimmers (notonectidae).

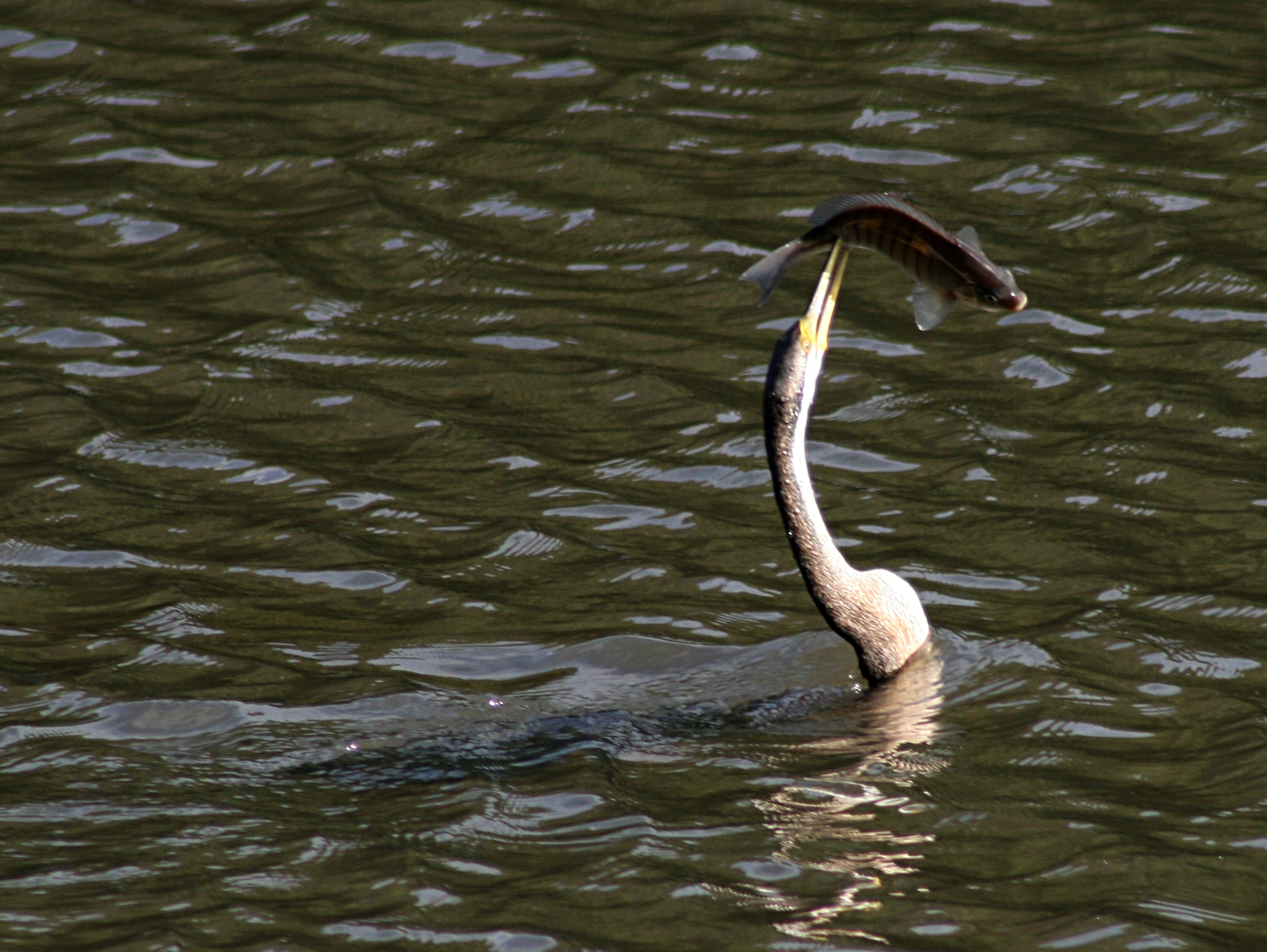
Female bringing fish to shore

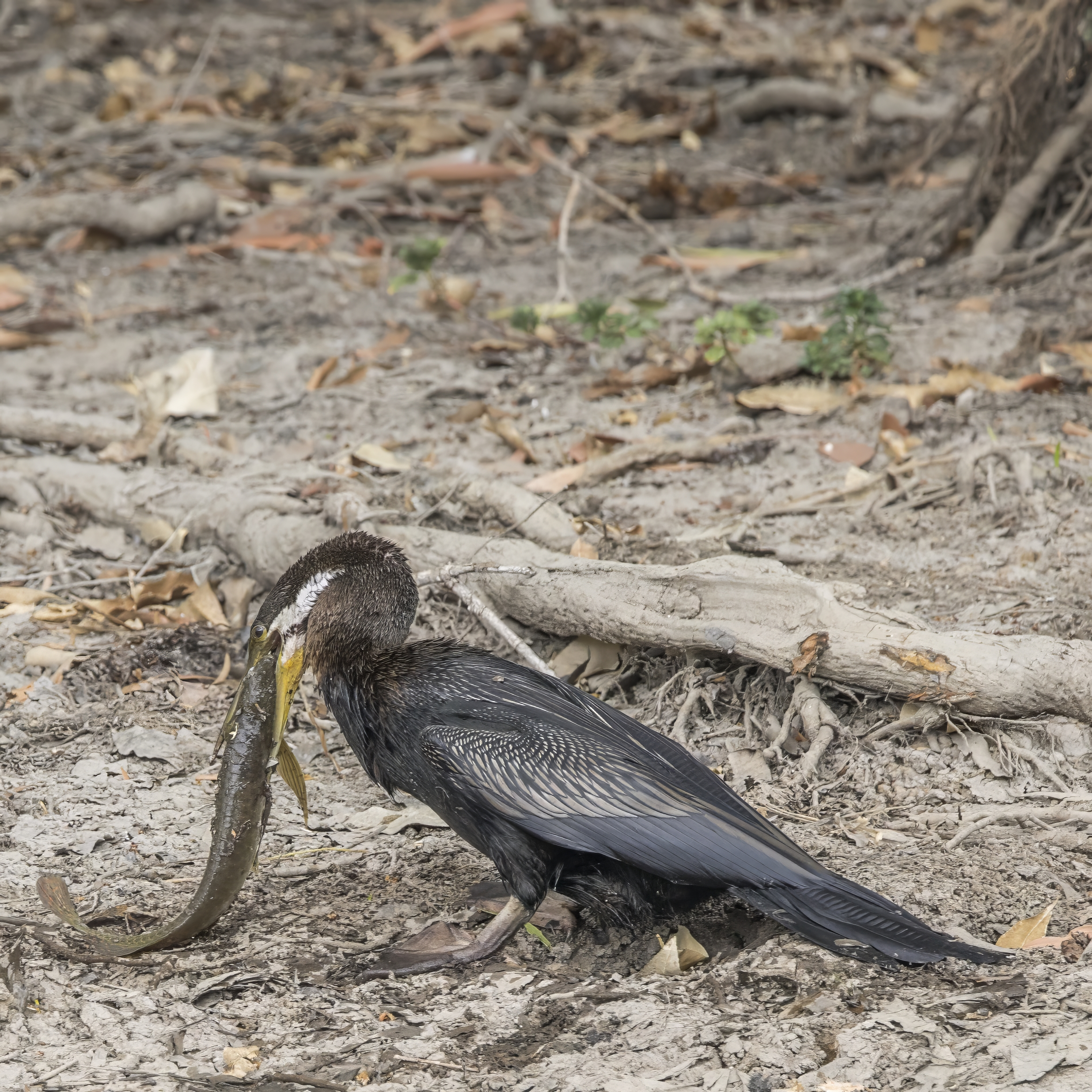
Male eating fish

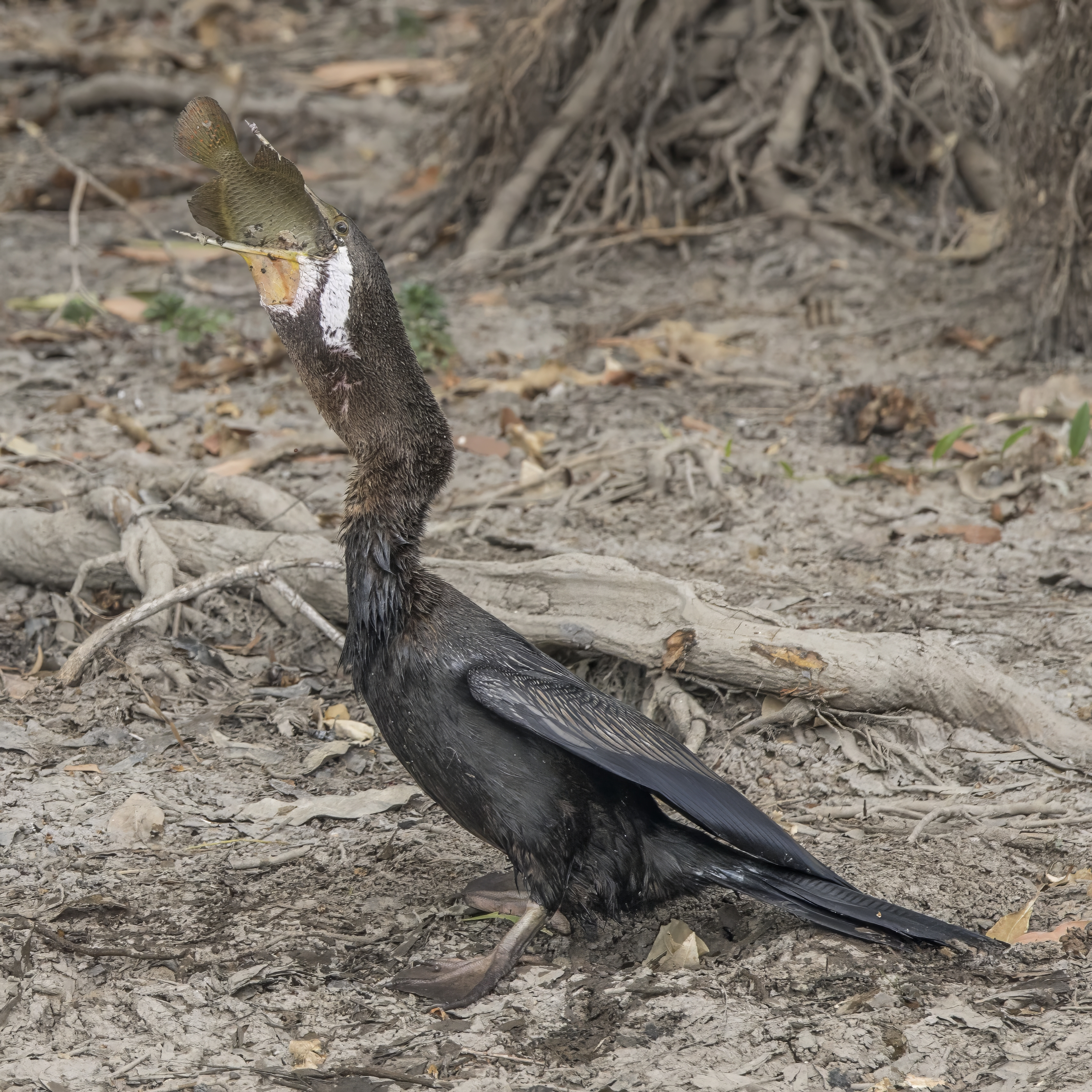
Eating a northern saratoga

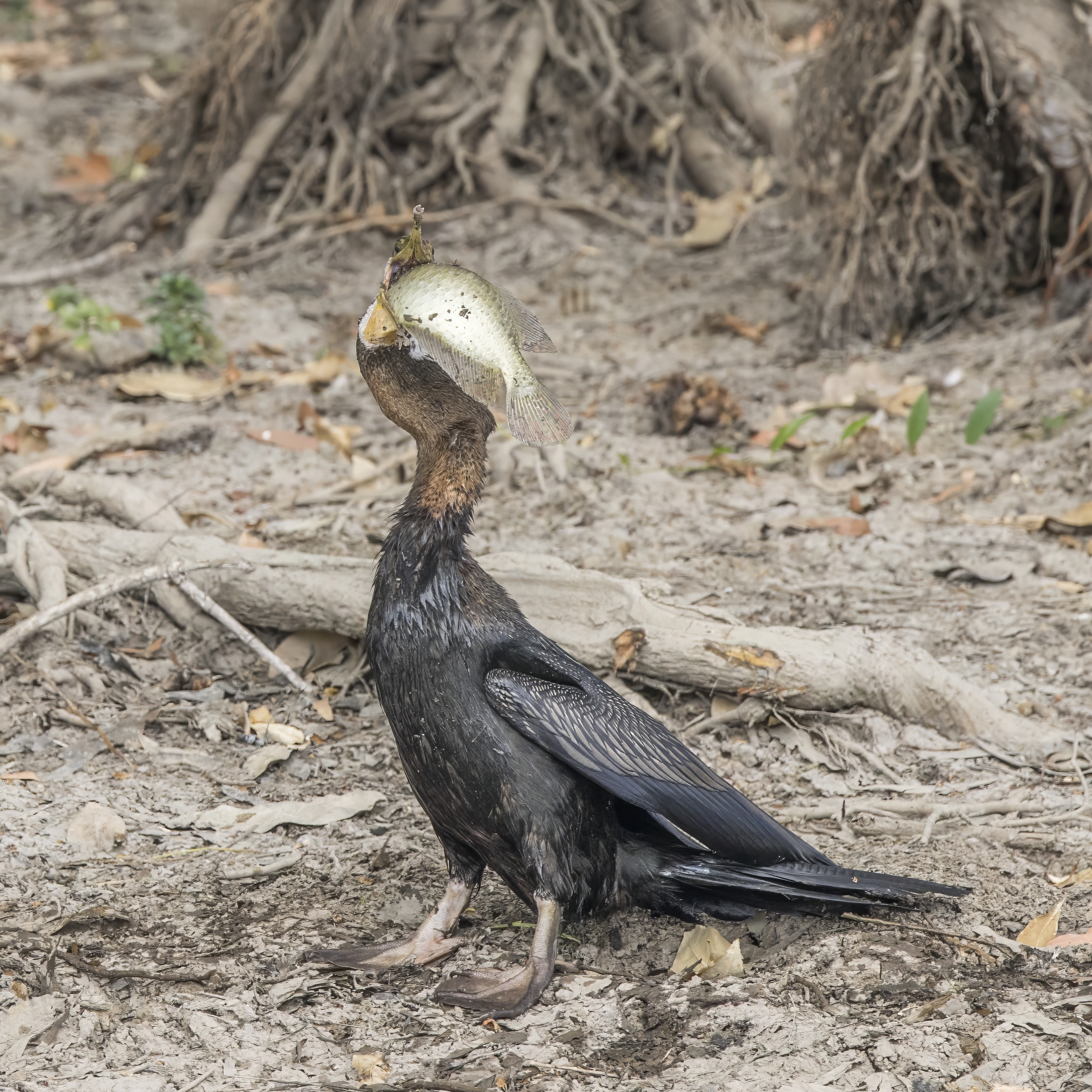
Eating a Scleropages jardinii

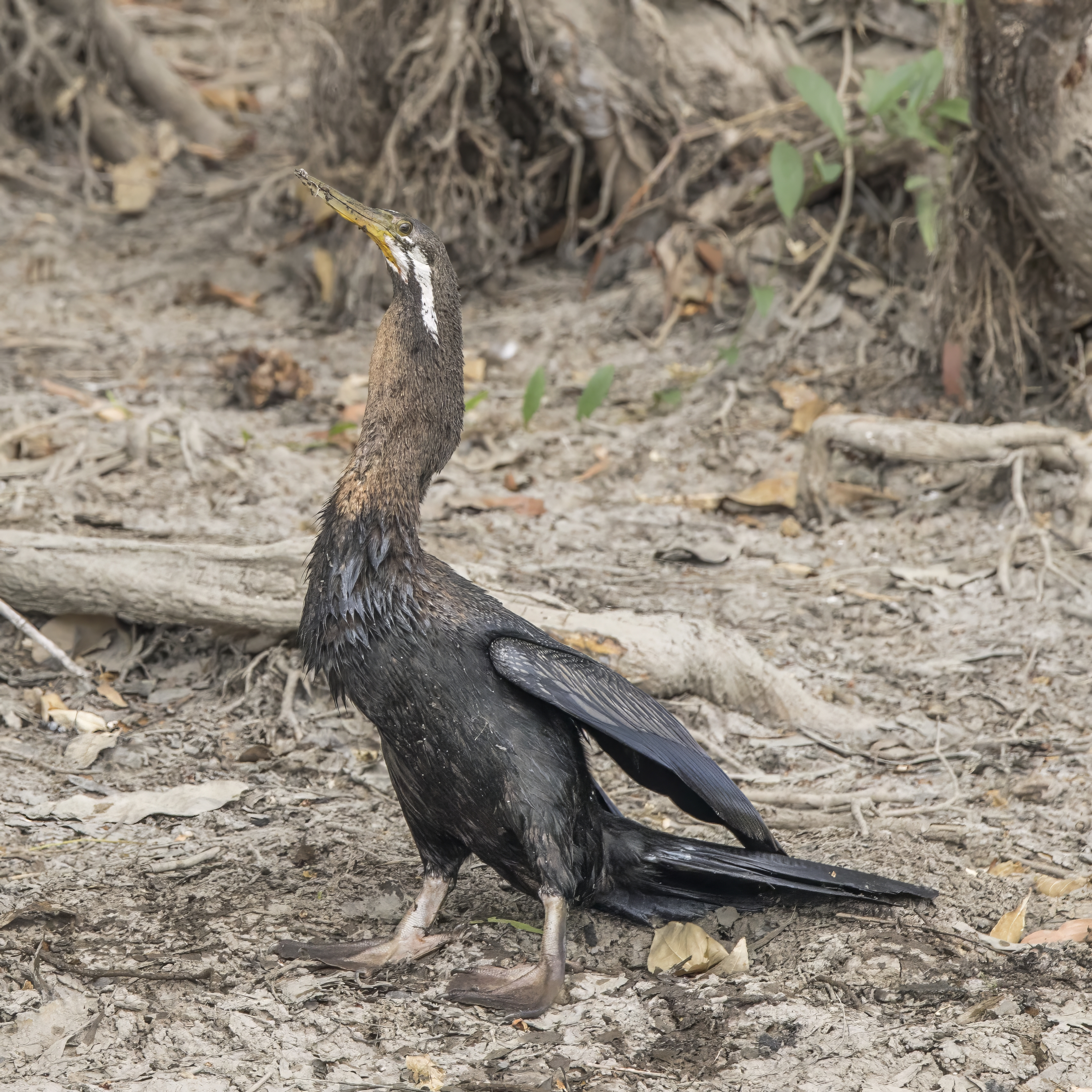
Yellow Water, Kakadu NP, Northern Territory

== Breeding ==
The Australasian darter breeds throughout its range on or near bodies of fresh or inland salt water. Breeding process will takes place once a year, or twice on rare occasions of two floods in the one year. Breeding takes place in spring (August to October) in southern Australia, during the wet season (January to March/April) in northern Australia, in April in the Trans-Fly region of southern New Guinea, August and September in the Lower Fly and July and November around Port Moresby. The nest is a large, wide dish-shaped structure made of sticks and lined with reeds, leaves and rushes, often located in the branches of a partly submerged tree or tree overhanging water. Darters often build their nests in cormorant colonies, where the nests can be distinguished by their larger size and lack of guano.

Three to five elongated oval eggs are laid, measuring 56 by 34 mm. They are pale blue but covered in a layer of chalky lime, and become progressively scratched and stained over the incubation period.

== Gallery ==
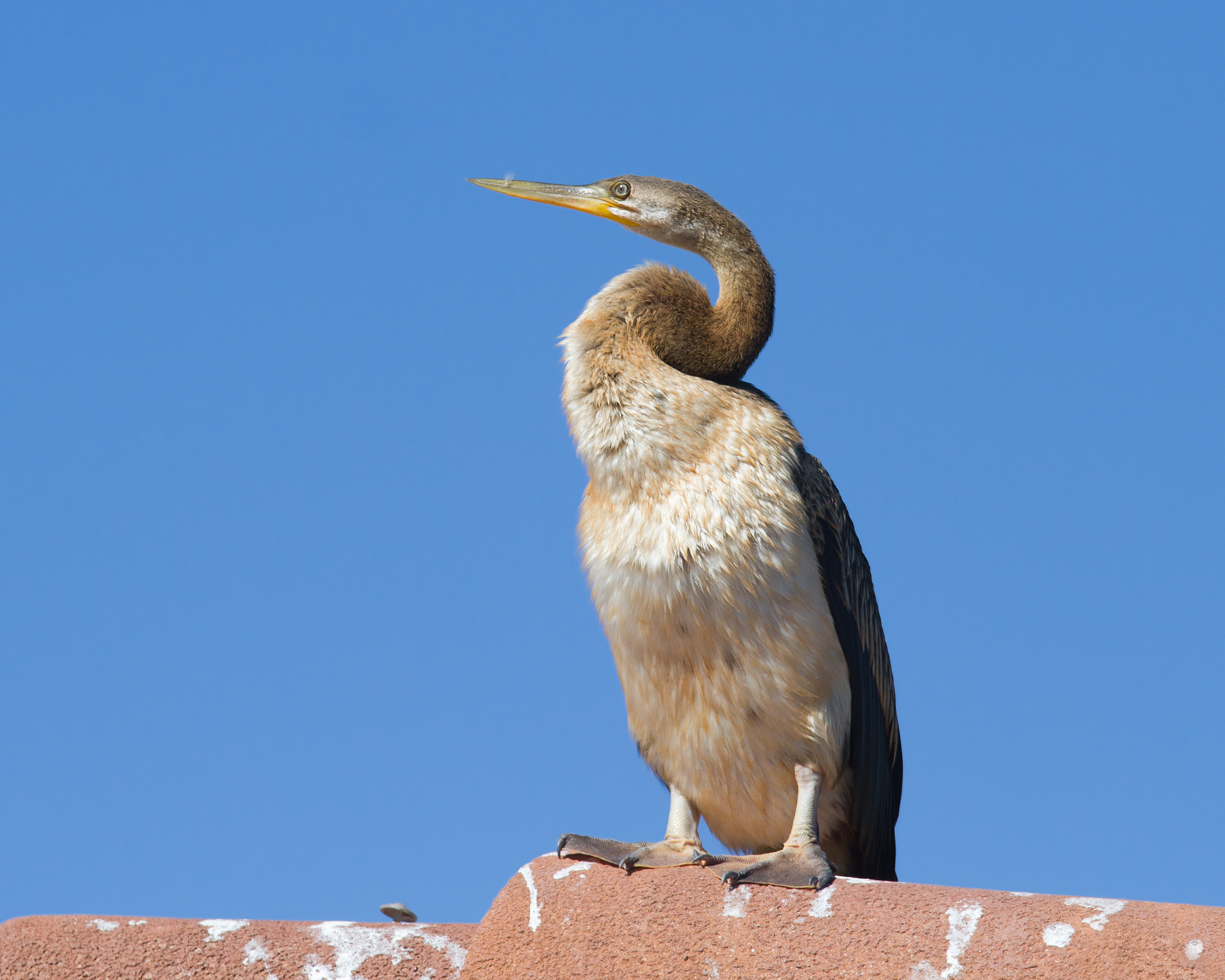
Immature male

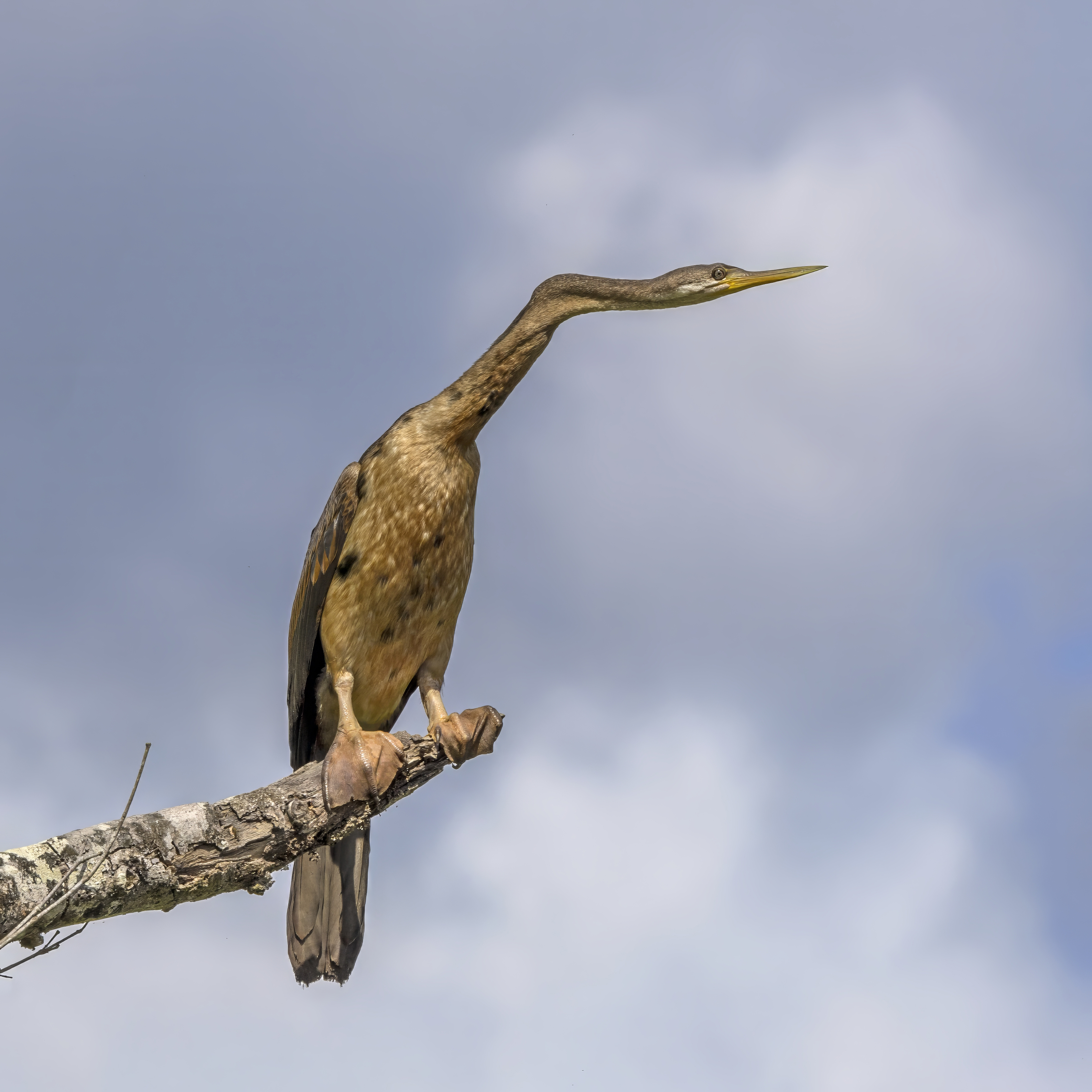
Young male

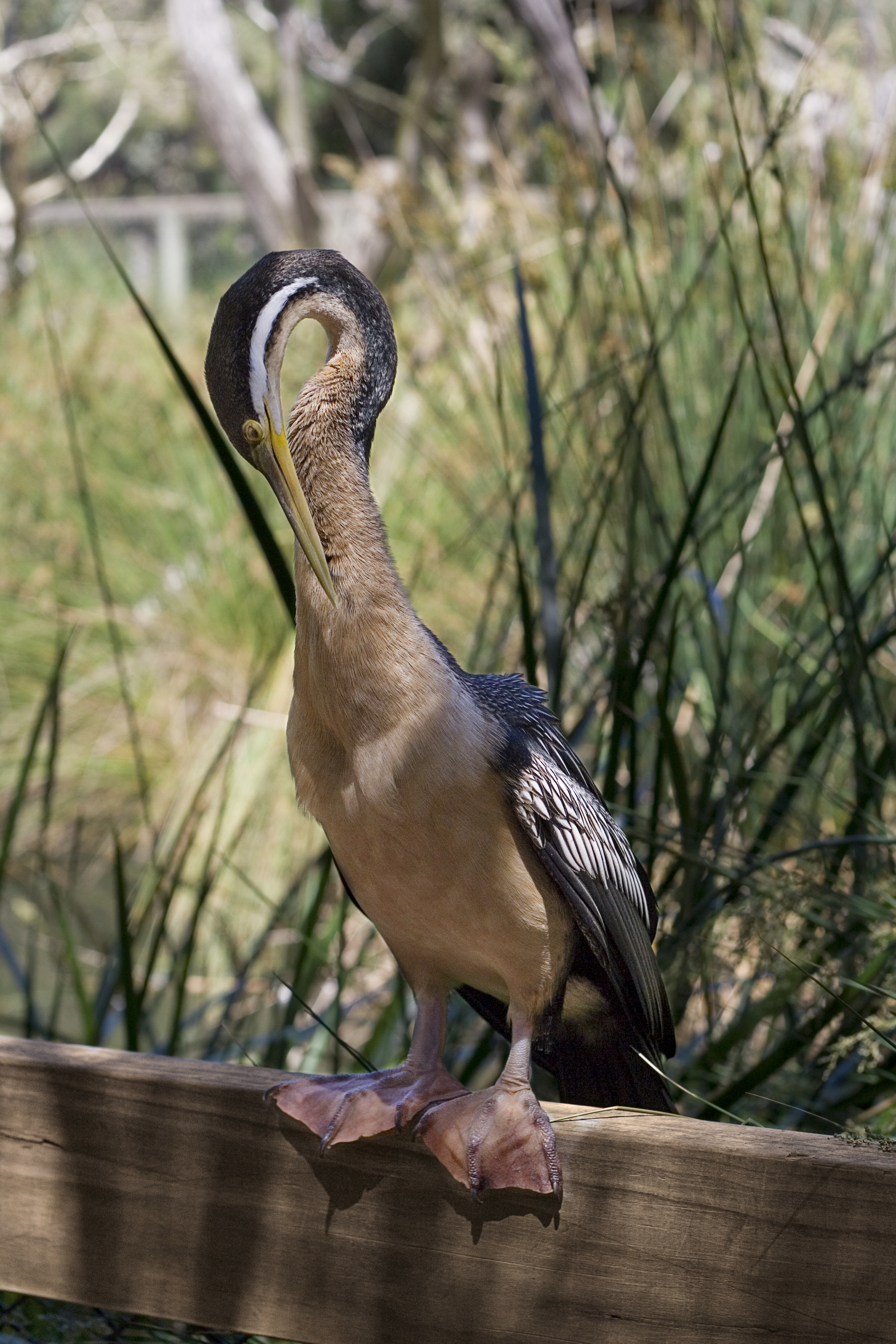
Male preening

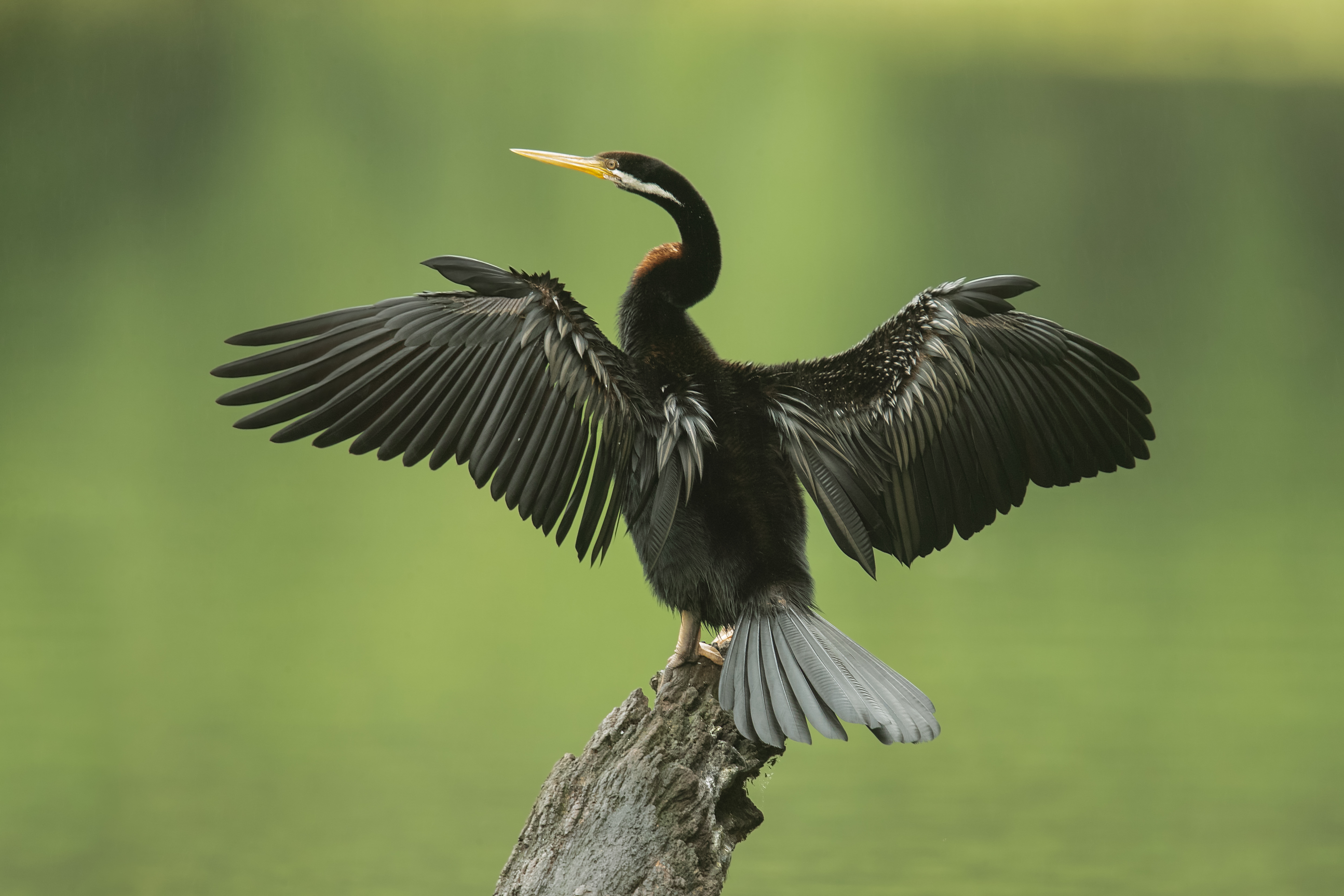
Male drying its wings

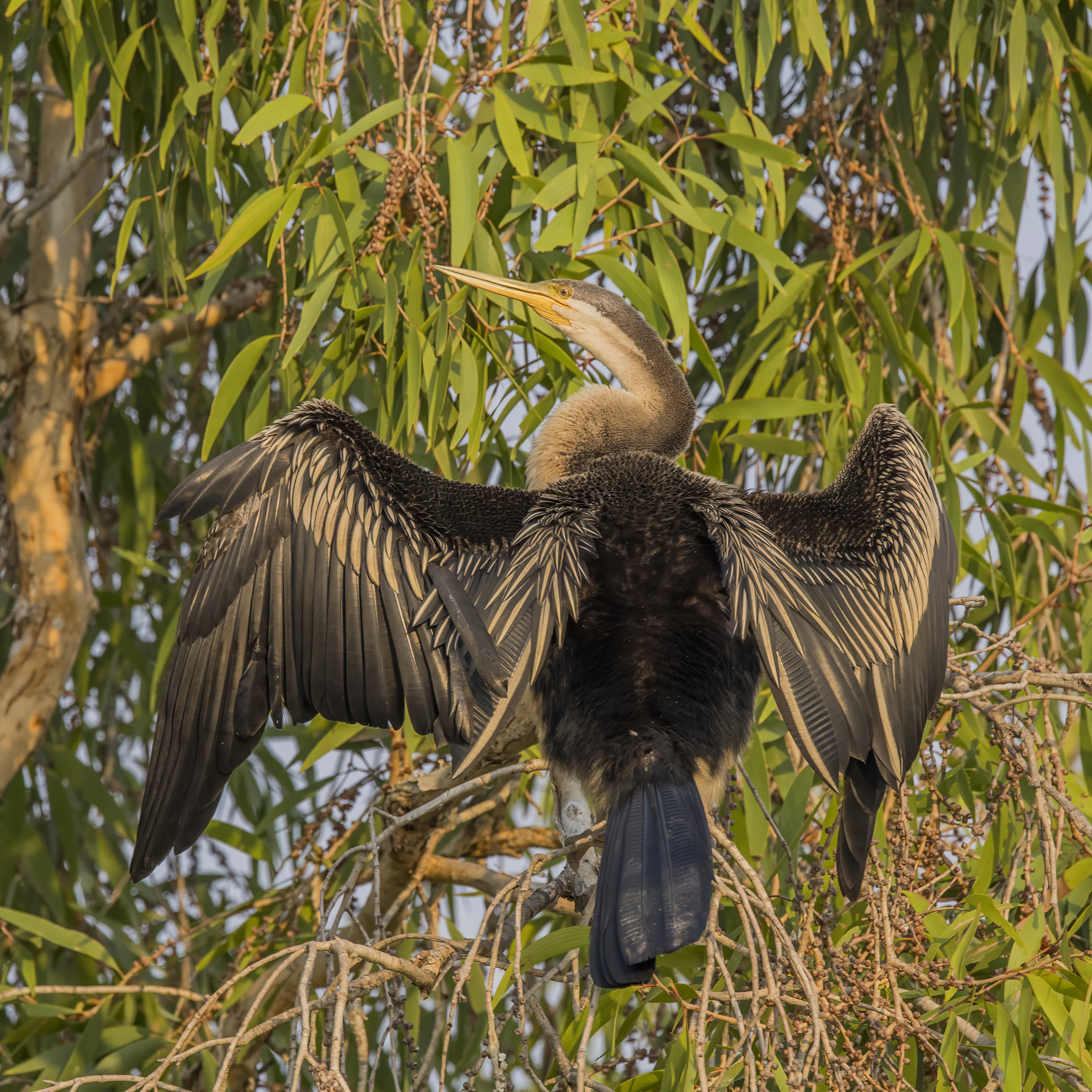
Female drying its wings

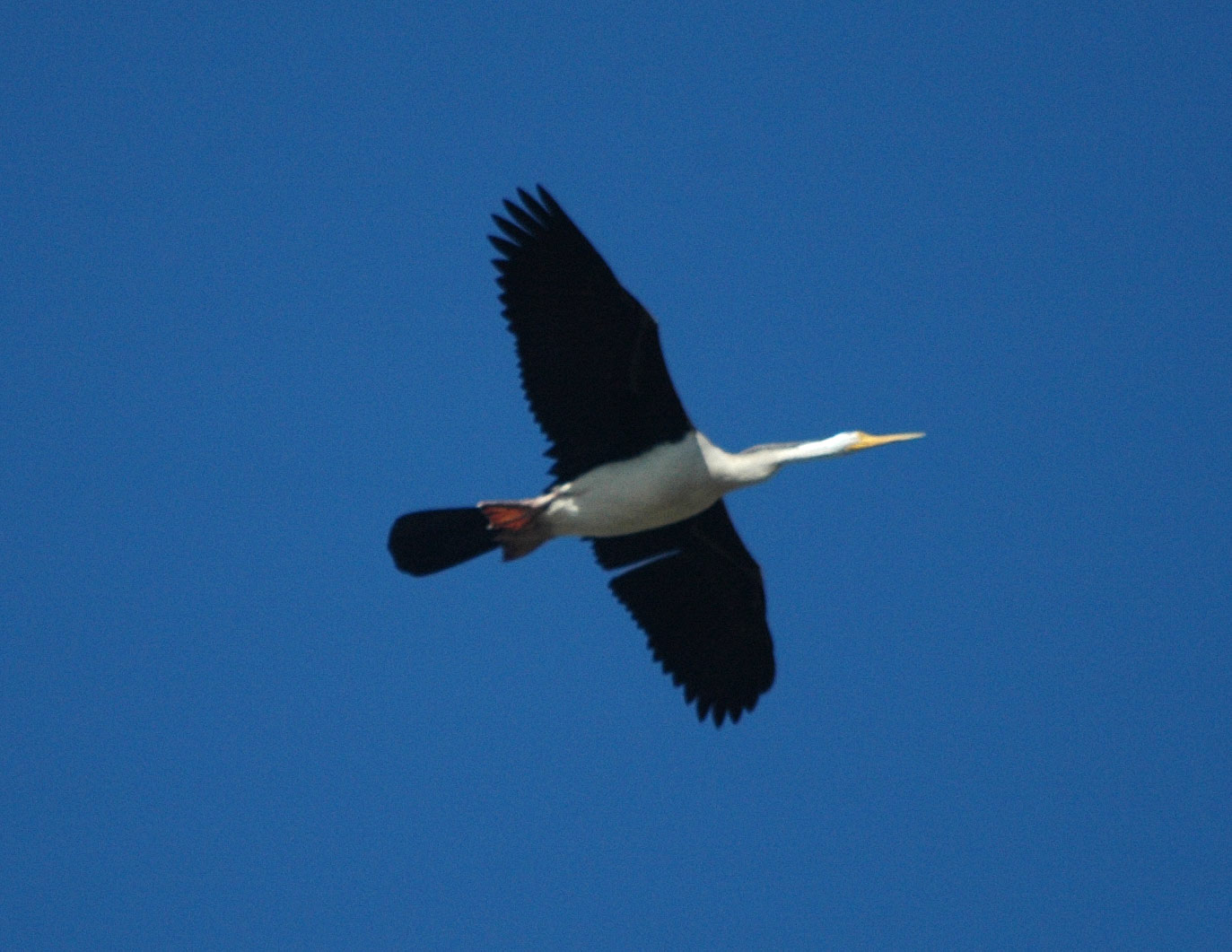
Female in flight

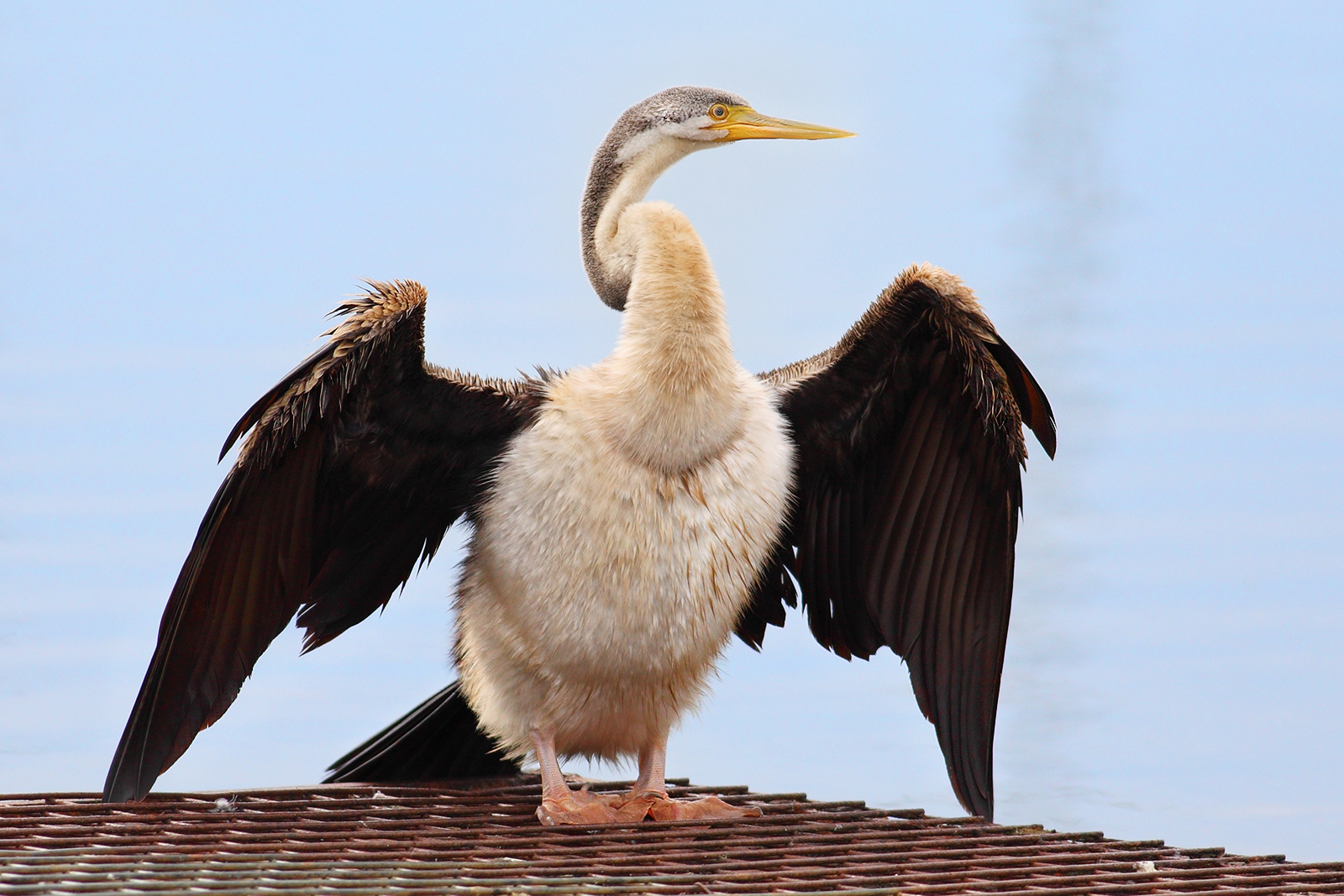
Female
