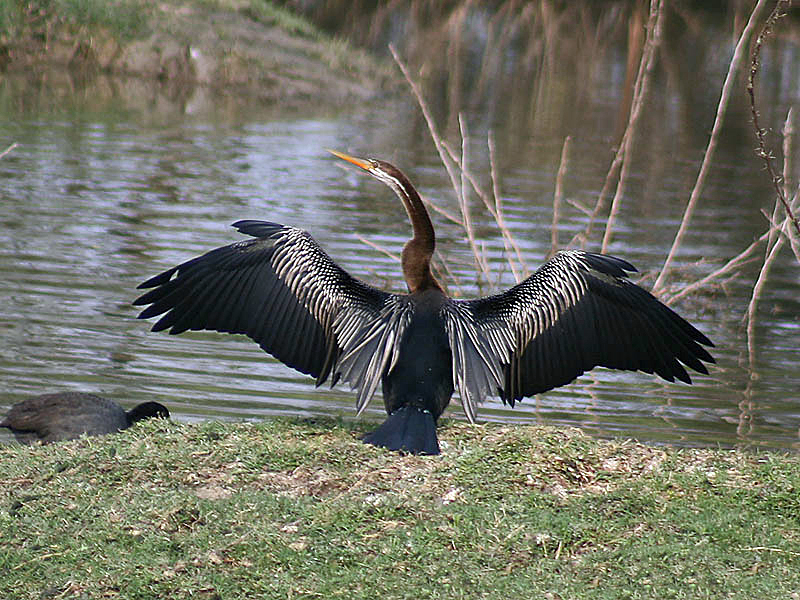

Conservation status
- Least Concern (IUCN 3.1)

Scientific classification
- Kingdom: Animalia
- Phylum: Chordata
- Class: Aves
- Order: Suliformes
- Family: Anhingidae
- Genus: Anhinga
- Species: A. melanogaster

Binomial name
- Anhinga melanogaster Pennant, 1769
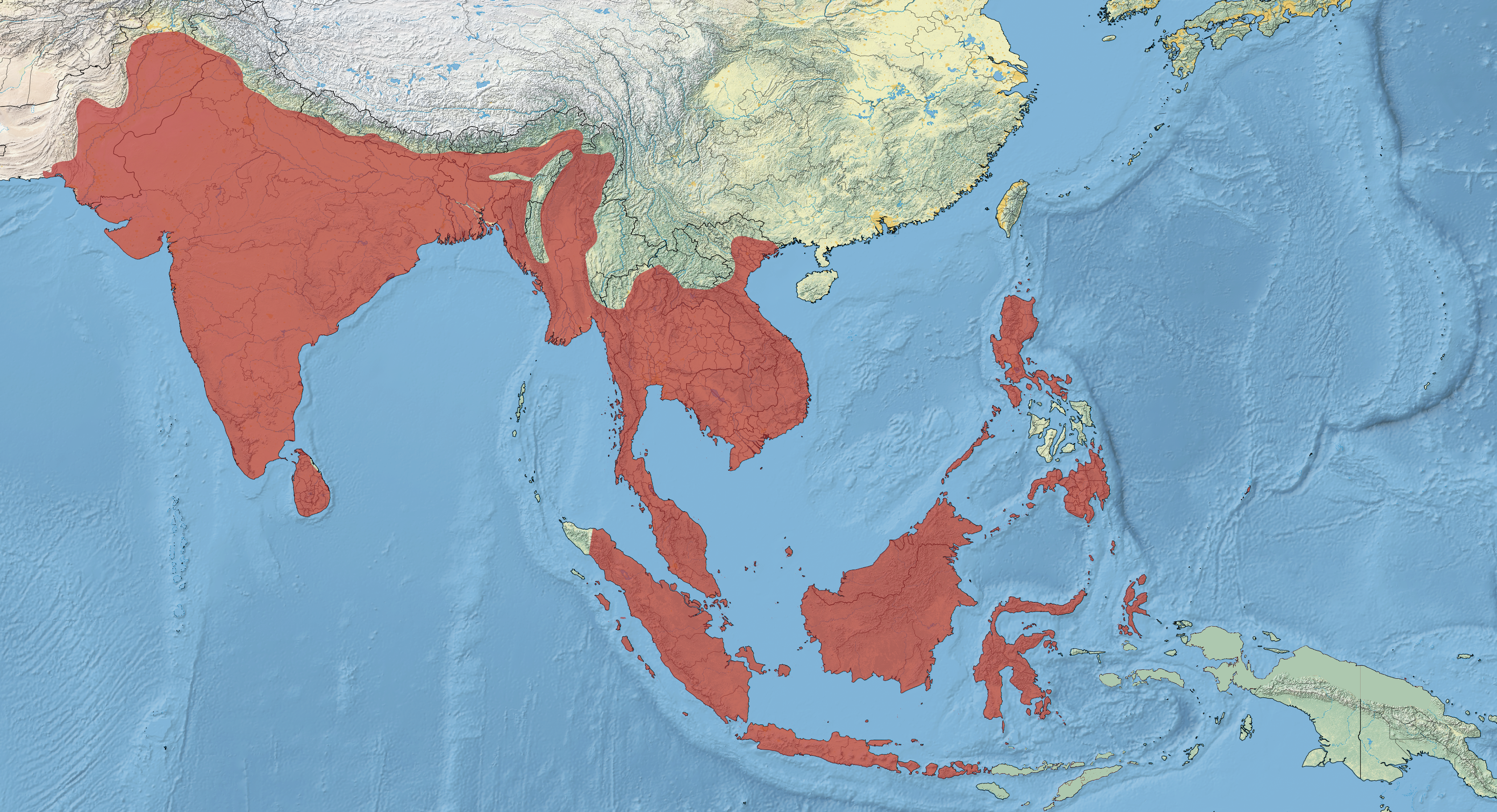
- approximate distribution

Synonyms
- Plotus melanogaster

= Oriental darter =

Species of bird

The Oriental darter (Anhinga melanogaster) is a water bird of tropical South Asia and Southeast Asia. It has a long and slender neck with a straight, pointed bill and, like the cormorant, it hunts for fish while its body is submerged in water. It spears a fish underwater, bringing it above the surface, tossing and juggling it before swallowing the fish head first. The body remains submerged as it swims, and the slender neck alone is visible above the water, which accounts for the colloquial name of snakebird. Like the cormorants, it has wettable feathers and it is often found perched on a rock or branch with its wings held open to dry.

== Description ==
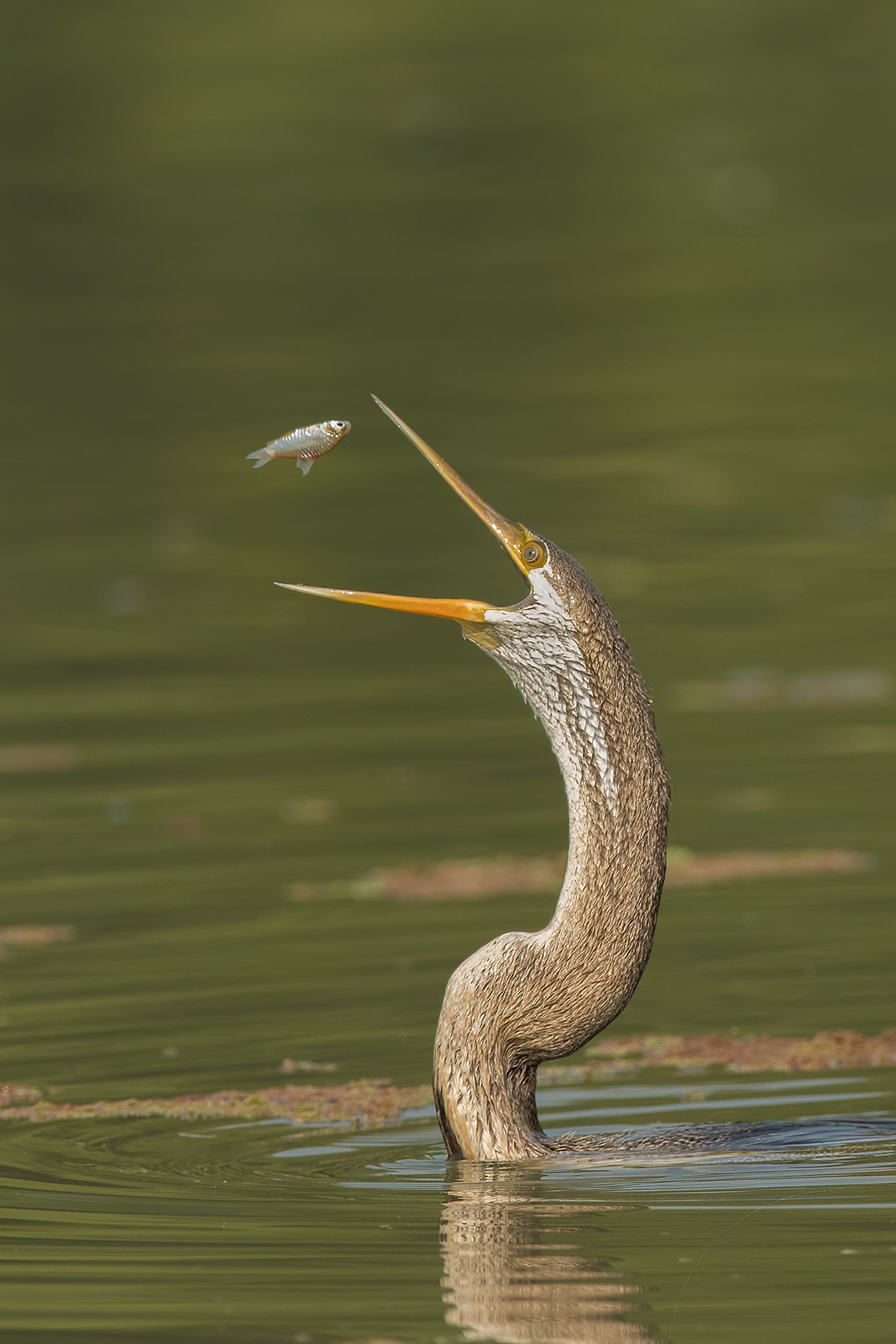
Fish are first speared and the snake-like neck emerges above the water to toss and swallow the fish head-first.

The Oriental darter is like all other anhingas, a cormorant-like species that has a very long neck. The structure of the neck is as in other species of darter with strongly developed muscles about a kink in the neck at the 8th and 9th vertebrae that allows it to be flexed and darted forward with rapid force to stab fish underwater. The edges of the commissures of the mandible tips have minute inward pointing serrations that hold impaled fish.

The adult plumage is black. The crown and neck are ideally bole (though often whitish or even amber) shading darker towards the back of the neck. The wing coverts and tertials have a silvery streaka along the shaft. A pale line over the eye and throat and a line running along the sides of the neck gives it a striped appearance. The iris is white with a yellow ring (brighter yellow in breeding birds) around it. The tip of the upper mandible is dark while the base is pale brown bill while the lower mandible is yellowish. The legs and webbing on the foot are yellow in immatures and non-breeding birds while breeding birds have darker grey tarsi and toes with yellow webbing. The sexes are not easily distinguishable but males tend to have black speckles that coalesce on the white throat. Adult females have a shorter bill and tend to have the black at the base of neck and chest separated from the hind neck by a wide buff band that ends at the shoulder. This pattern however is also found in immatures whose neck is lighter and lack the long pointed scapulars. In flight the long and slender neck, wide wing and wedge shaped tail make it distinctive. Young birds have a pale brown neck and appear whitish on the underside and lack the white streak along the side of the neck. The inner secondaries or tertials and the central tail feathers appear wavy or corrugated. The tail is long and made up of twelve stiff feathers which are dragged along the ground when the bird attempts to walk or hop on land.

== Taxonomy ==
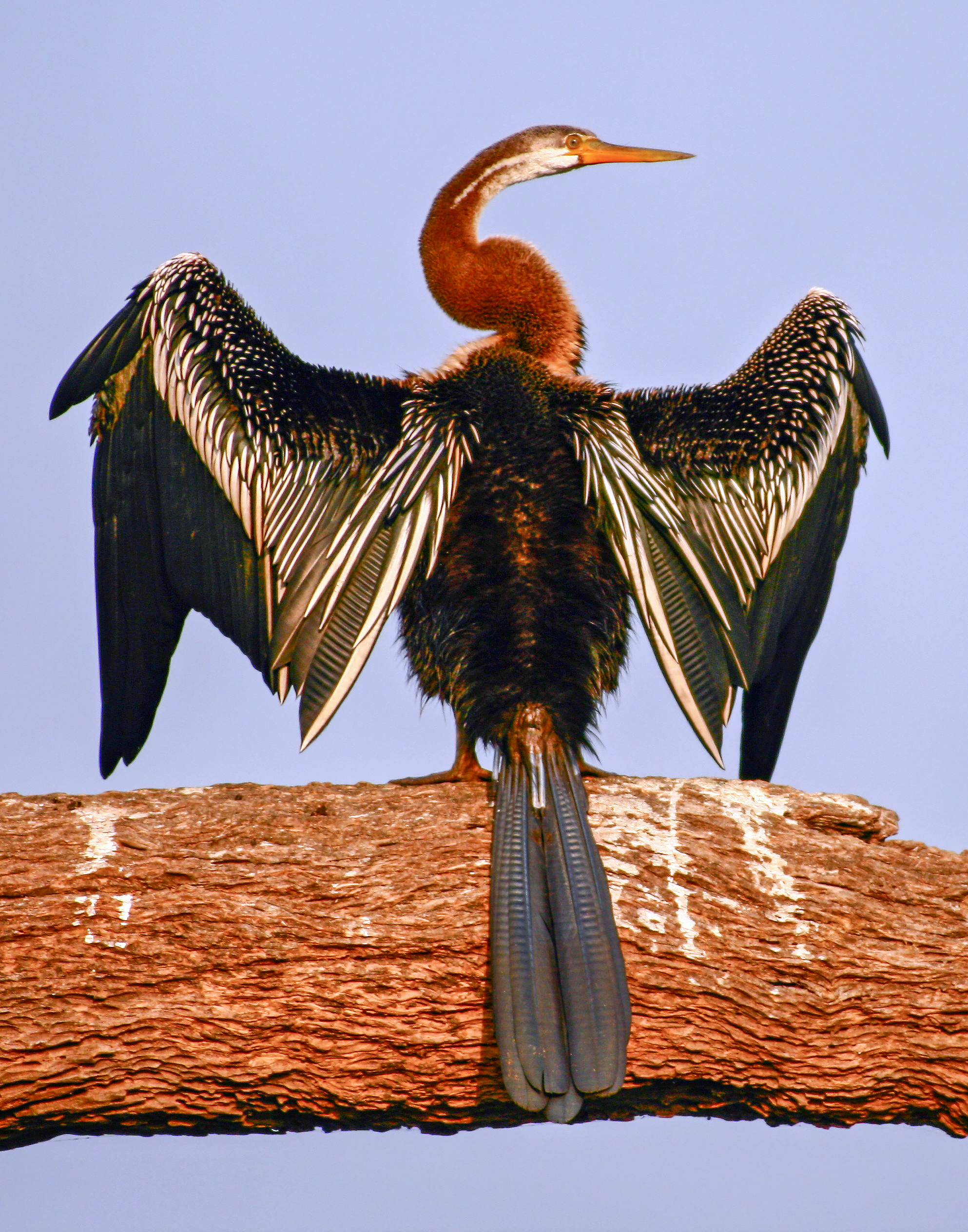
Sunning on a perch

The Oriental darter is a member of the darter family, Anhingidae, and is closely related to the American (Anhinga anhinga), African (Anhinga rufa, with vulsini of Madagascar as a subspecies), and Australasian (Anhinga novaehollandiae) darters. These were for sometime treated as subspecies of Anhinga melanogaster. The Oriental darter differs in appearance from American darters most recognizably by its white lateral neck stripe.

== Behaviour and ecology ==
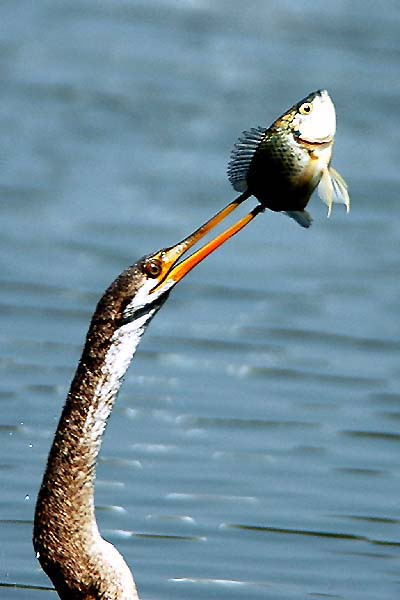
Prey that has been speared is first brought above the surface.

The Oriental darter is found mainly in freshwater lakes and streams. They usually forage singly, with the entire body submerged, swimming slowly forward using their webbed feet while the head and neck is moved jerkily above the water. It darts its neck to impale fish and then brings them out of water, tossing them into the air before swallowing the fish head first. They may sometimes be found along with cormorants which share the habit of spreading out their wings to dry when perched on a waterside rock or tree. They sometimes soar on thermals during the warm part of the day but will alternate flapping and gliding in normal flight.

They nest in mixed species heronries where they build a stick platform on the nest tree which is usually surrounded by water. Several pairs may nest close to each other. The branch is flattened by the birds prior to the placement of the sticks that form the nest platform. The nest sites are defended from other birds with posturing and thrusts of the neck. The breeding season is June to August (during the rainy season) in northern India, April–May in southwestern India and in winter in southeastern India (during the northeast monsoon). The usual clutch consists of three to six spindle shaped bluish-green eggs with a white chalky covering that gets soiled over time. Both parents incubate the eggs, beginning after the first egg is laid which leads to asynchronous hatching of the young. The newly hatched chicks are bare and covered with some down on the head. As they grow, they become covered in white down. The chicks feed by thrusting their heads down the throat of their parents.

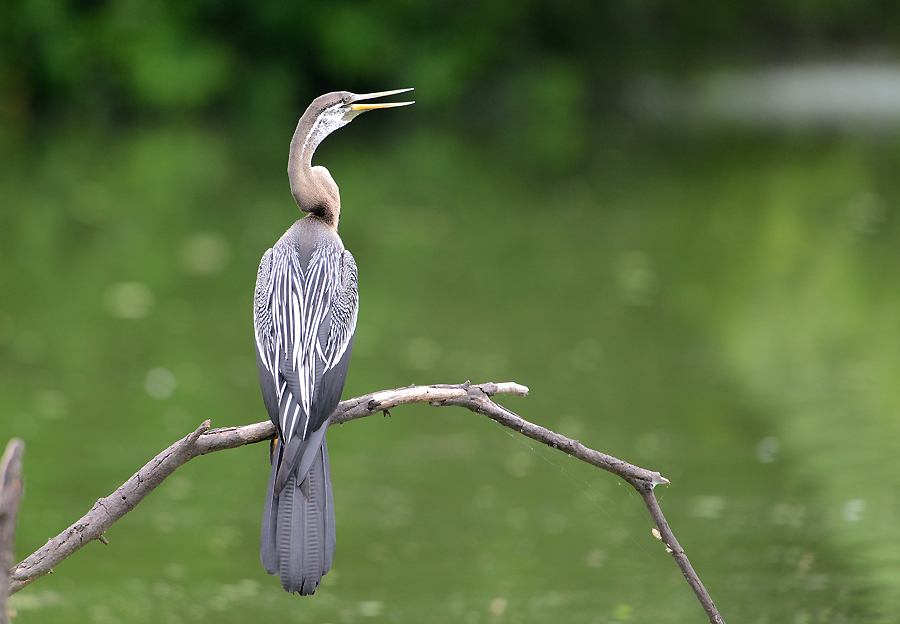
The feathers of the scapulars and tail have wavy or corrugated webbing.

Adults go through a synchronous moult of their flight feathers after the breeding season, resulting in the loss of flying ability for a brief period. When disturbed from their perches during this period, they dive into the water below and attempt to escape underwater. This escape behaviour is also employed by chicks at the nest. They are very silent except at the nest where they produce grunts and croaks and a disyllabic chigi-chigi-chigi. Chicks are noisy when begging for food. Adults roost communally in trees close to or over water.

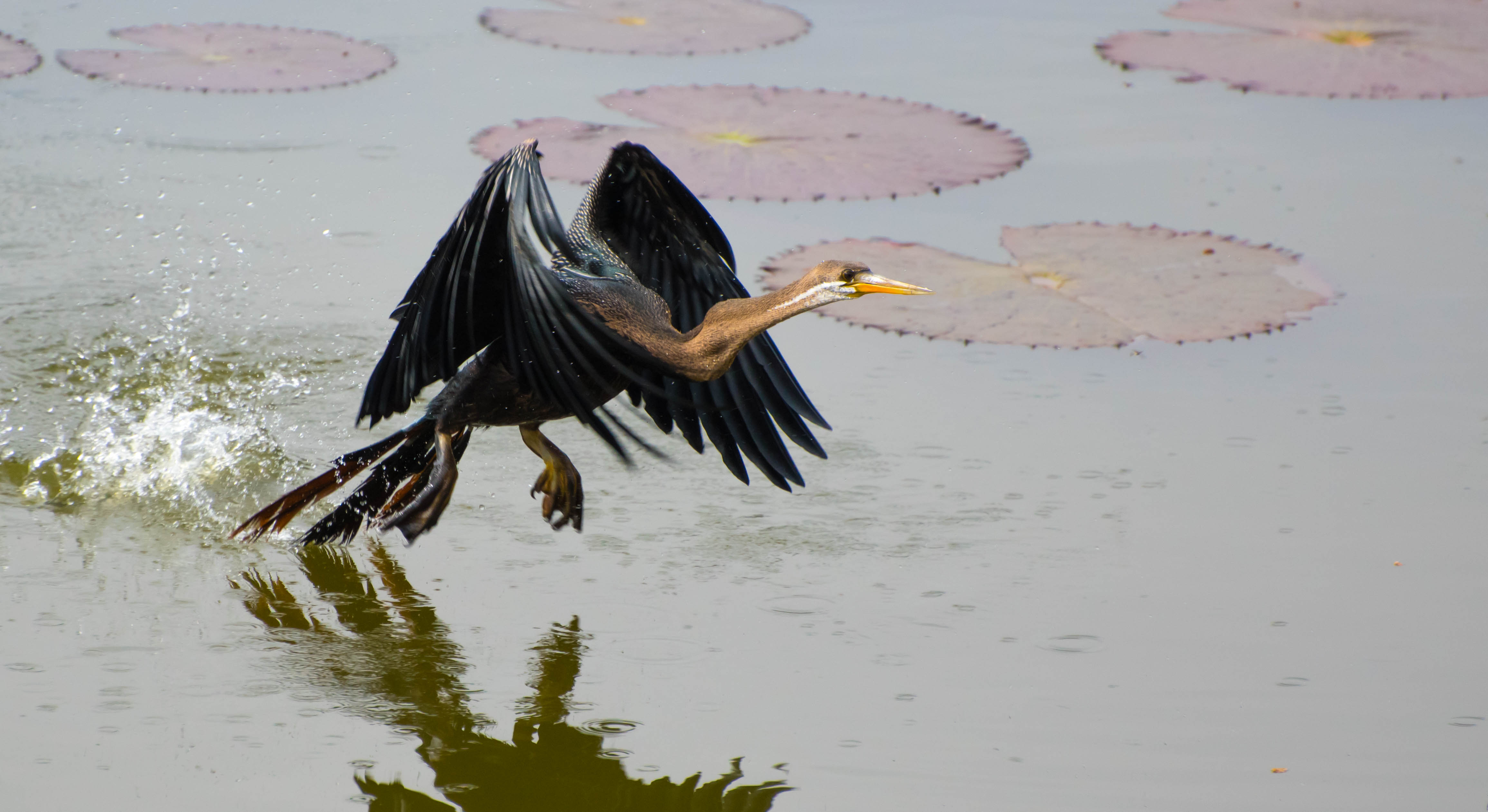
A darter taking off from water

Chicks, especially those more than half grown are sometimes preyed on by raptors such as Pallas's fish eagle (Haliaetus leucoryphus). The long scapular feathers were once popular for use in decorating hats. A number of parasites have been recorded from adult birds including Schwartzitrema anhingi (Trematoda), Petasiger nicolli, Mesorchis pendulus, and Echinorhynchotaenia tritesticulata (Cestoda:Dilepididae).

Measurements

India
Culmen		74–90 mm (2.9–3.5 in)
Wing		331–357 mm (13.0–14.1 in)
Tail		202–240 mm (8.0–9.4 in)
Tarsus		42–47 mm (1.7–1.9 in)
Weight		1,160–1,500 g (40.9–52.9 oz)

In some parts of northeastern India, darters were (or are) used by tribals to capture fish from streams. A ring is tied around the neck to prevent them from swallowing the prey just as is done with cormorant fishing in parts of Southeast Asia.
