= Diascordium =

Obsolete medication

In pre-modern medicine, diascordium (medical Lat. diascordium, for diascordiōn, from Gr. διὰ σκορδίων, [a preparation] of scordium, σκόρδιον, "a strong-smelling plant mentioned by Dioscorides", possibly Teucrium scordium), or diascord, is a kind of electuary, or opiate, first described by Jerome Frascata, and denominated from the dried leaves of scordium, which is an ingredient therein. The other ingredients are red roses, bole armoniac, storax, cinnamon, cassia lignea (coarse bark of Cinnamomum cassia), dittany, tormentil roots, bistort, gentian, galbanum, amber, terra sigillata, opium, long pepper, ginger, mel rosatum, and malmsey. It was used against malignant fevers, the plague, worms, colic, to promote sleep, and resist putrefaction. In 1746, diascordium was offered in two forms: with or without opium.

In 1654, Nicholas Culpeper wrote in his London Dispensatorie about the mixture: "It is a well composed Electuary, a something appropriate to the nature of women, for it Provokes the Terms, hastens their Labor, helps their usual sickness at the time of their Lying-in, I know nothing better."

Over the years, the composition of diascordium was modified, until it gradually changed into what became known as pulvis catechu compositus ("compound powder of catechu").
