= John Bole =

John Bole may refer to:

- John Bole (MP) (fl. 1407–10), MP for Shaftesbury
- John Bole (archbishop), Roman Catholic Archbishop of Armagh (15th century)
- John A. Bole (1906–1943), U.S. World War II submariner

== See also ==
- John Boles (disambiguation)
