= Diplonychus rusticus =

Scientific classification
- Domain: Eukaryota
- Kingdom: Animalia
- Phylum: Arthropoda
- Class: Insecta
- Order: Hemiptera
- Suborder: Heteroptera
- Family: Belostomatidae
- Genus: Diplonychus
- Species: D. rusticus

Binomial name
- Diplonychus rusticus Fabricius, 1871

Species of true bug

Diplonychus rusticus is an insect native in the Philippines, India, and Australia commonly known as "water bug". This insect lives in shallow waters and feed on aquatic insects including mosquito larvae.

In a study conducted by Dr. Pio Javier of the University of the Philippines in Los Baños Laguna, Philippines, water bugs could be an effective biological control agent for dengue-carrying mosquitoes. He found out that water bug can consume 86-99 full grown mosquito larvae per day, it is tolerable to chlorinated waters and can reproduce easily. With that, water bug can be distributed in all mosquito habitats such as used tires, water containers, and other mosquito breeding sites.

Females prefer males that carry eggs on their back.
