= Joe Boles =

Australian rules footballer

Personal information
- Full name: Joseph Robert Boles
- Born: 5 March 1880; Flemington, Victoria
- Died: 8 August 1950 (aged 70); Parkville, Victoria

Playing career^{1}
Years	Club	Games (Goals)
1903	South Melbourne	1 (1)
- ^{1} Playing statistics correct to the end of 1903.

Joseph Robert Boles (5 March 1880 – 8 August 1950) was an Australian rules footballer who played with South Melbourne in the Victorian Football League (VFL).
