= John Boles =

John Boles may refer to:

- John Boles (actor) (1895–1969), American actor
- John Boles (baseball) (born 1948), American baseball executive
- John Boles (sport shooter) (1888–1952), American sports shooter
- John B. Boles (born 1943), American historian
- John Patrick Boles (1930–2014), American Roman Catholic bishop

== See also ==
- John Bole (disambiguation)
