= Bole (color) =

Shade of reddish brown

Color coordinates
- Hex triplet: #79443B
- sRGB^{B} (r, g, b): (121, 68, 59)
- HSV (h, s, v): (9°, 51%, 47%)
- CIELCh_{uv} (L, C, h): (35, 39, 20°)
- Source: ISCC-NBS
- ISCC–NBS descriptor: Moderate reddish brown
- B: Normalized to [0–255] (byte)

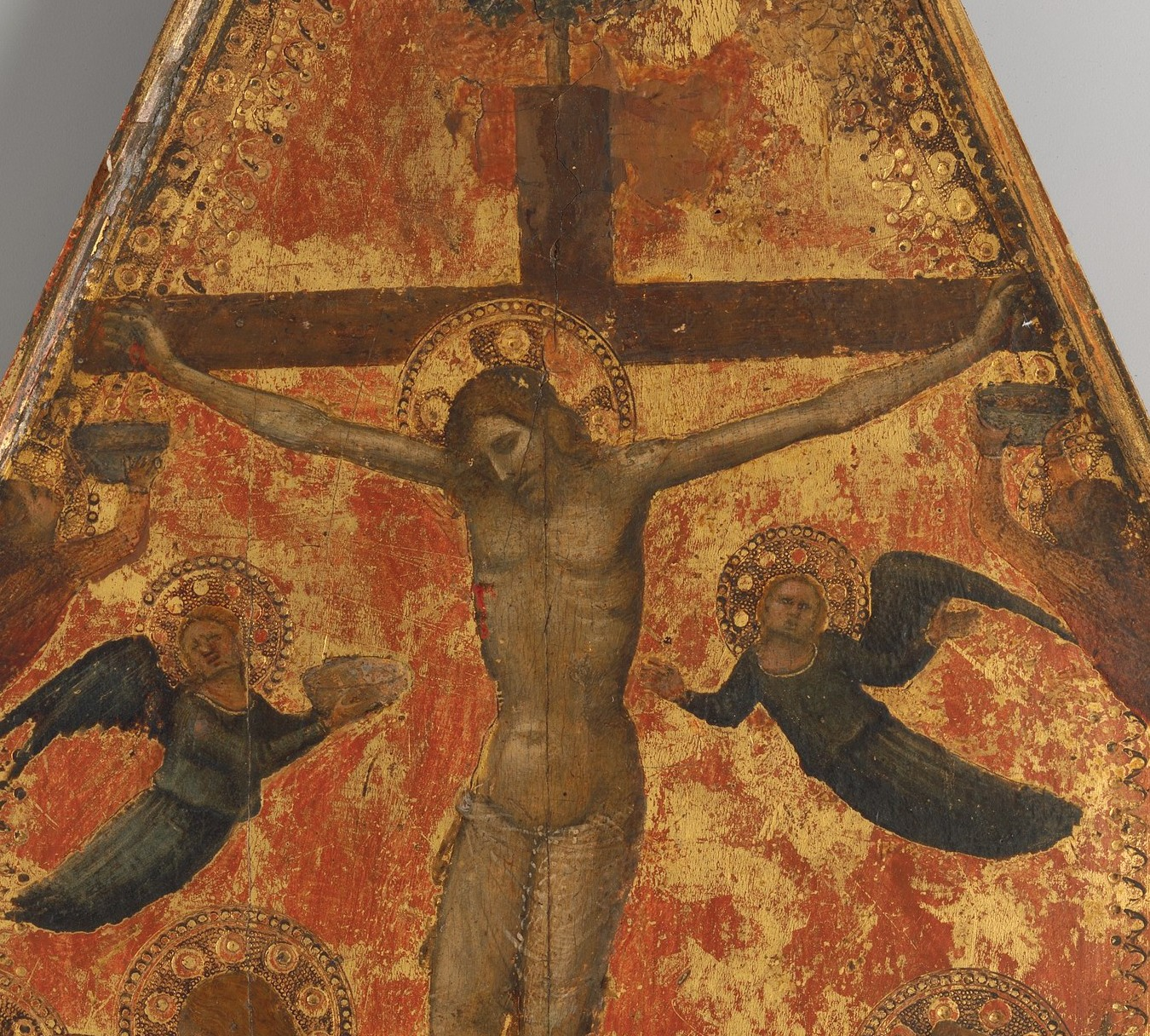
14th-century gold-ground Italian painting where the gold leaf has worn away to reveal the red bole beneath

Bole is a shade of reddish brown. The color term derives from Latin bōlus (or dirt) and refers to a kind of soft fine clay whose reddish-brown varieties are used as pigments, and as a coating in panel paintings and frames underneath the paint or gold leaf. Under gold leaf, it "warms" the color, which can have a greenish shade otherwise. However, bole in art is a good deal more red and less brown than the modern shade; it is often called Armenian bole. Although bole also means the trunk of a tree, these words are simply homographs that do not share an etymological origin.

== Overview ==
Another name for the color bole is terra rosa. The color name terra rosa has been used as a synonym for bole since 1753. The color terra rosa is classified a warm red color. In art, it's classified as being similar to Venetian red, but more pink or salmon.

Bole is one of the oldest color names in English. The first recorded use of bole as a color name in English was in the year 1386.

== See also ==
- List of colors
