= Armenian bole =

Type of clay

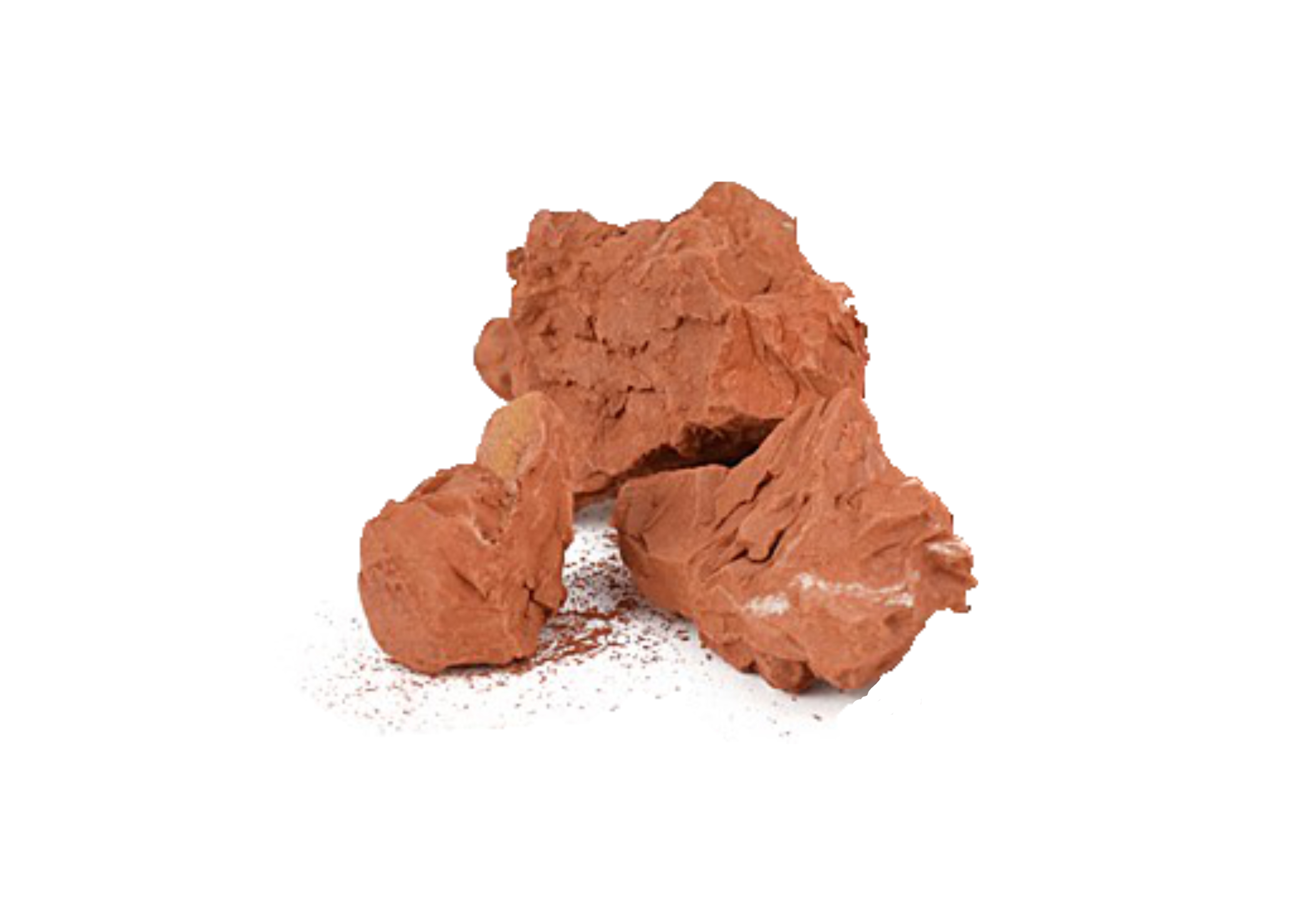
Armenian bole

Armenian bole, also known as bolus armenus or bole armoniac, is an earthy clay, usually red, native to Armenia but also found in other places. The term Armenian was later referred to a specific quality of the clay. Originally used in medication, it has also been used as a pigment, as a poliment or base for gilding, and for other uses. It is red due to the presence of iron oxide; the clay also contains hydrous silicates of aluminum and possibly magnesium.

== Uses ==
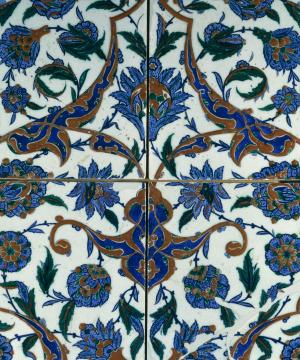
The distinctive flame red is a striking feature of the mature style of Iznik pottery. It comes from an iron-rich red earth, or bole, found in Armenia.

Historically, the term bolu or bolus was used only for medicinal earths and Armenian bole was used as an astringent, prescribed against diarrhea, dysentery, and bleeding. References to Armenian bole were made by Theophrastus, Dioscorides (c. 41–90 AD) and Pliny the Elder (23–79 AD). Externally, it was used in strengthening plasters, against dislocations of the joints. Physicians sometimes also called it Rubrica Synopica, from the city of Synope, where it is supposed to be found. Use for internal medicine may have side effects as the minerals often include heavy metals such as arsenic, cadmium, lead and zinc that can cause toxicity.

In the nineteenth century, it was incorporated into non-soluble tooth powder. These types of powders would get stuck between the gums and the teeth and leave an unsightly discoloration. As a result, they were coloured red using Armenian bole to disguise the buildup around the teeth.

It is also used in bookbinding for coloring, or applied to the edges during gilding, as a base for the gold leaf and to give the binding a greater depth and luster. In pottery, it is used as a red pigment for the İznik pottery of Turkey. Finally, it has also been used in the waterproofing of windmill sails. A popular mixture was: 10 liters of water, combined with 0.75 liter linseed oil, 0.75 liter grease, and 1 kg of bolus.

== See also ==
- Levant bole, a similar clay, often used in place of Armenian bole
